

156001–156100 

|-bgcolor=#fefefe
| 156001 ||  || — || September 7, 2001 || Socorro || LINEAR || NYS || align=right | 1.8 km || 
|-id=002 bgcolor=#fefefe
| 156002 ||  || — || September 7, 2001 || Socorro || LINEAR || NYS || align=right | 1.1 km || 
|-id=003 bgcolor=#fefefe
| 156003 ||  || — || September 8, 2001 || Socorro || LINEAR || — || align=right | 1.2 km || 
|-id=004 bgcolor=#fefefe
| 156004 ||  || — || September 11, 2001 || Socorro || LINEAR || V || align=right data-sort-value="0.96" | 960 m || 
|-id=005 bgcolor=#E9E9E9
| 156005 ||  || — || September 12, 2001 || Palomar || NEAT || — || align=right | 2.0 km || 
|-id=006 bgcolor=#fefefe
| 156006 ||  || — || September 14, 2001 || Palomar || NEAT || — || align=right | 1.6 km || 
|-id=007 bgcolor=#fefefe
| 156007 ||  || — || September 10, 2001 || Socorro || LINEAR || FLO || align=right | 1.2 km || 
|-id=008 bgcolor=#fefefe
| 156008 ||  || — || September 10, 2001 || Socorro || LINEAR || — || align=right | 1.3 km || 
|-id=009 bgcolor=#fefefe
| 156009 ||  || — || September 12, 2001 || Socorro || LINEAR || FLO || align=right | 1.2 km || 
|-id=010 bgcolor=#fefefe
| 156010 ||  || — || September 10, 2001 || Socorro || LINEAR || NYS || align=right | 1.7 km || 
|-id=011 bgcolor=#fefefe
| 156011 ||  || — || September 10, 2001 || Socorro || LINEAR || — || align=right | 1.8 km || 
|-id=012 bgcolor=#E9E9E9
| 156012 ||  || — || September 10, 2001 || Socorro || LINEAR || — || align=right | 1.6 km || 
|-id=013 bgcolor=#fefefe
| 156013 ||  || — || September 10, 2001 || Socorro || LINEAR || — || align=right | 4.3 km || 
|-id=014 bgcolor=#fefefe
| 156014 ||  || — || September 14, 2001 || Palomar || NEAT || — || align=right | 1.3 km || 
|-id=015 bgcolor=#FA8072
| 156015 ||  || — || September 14, 2001 || Palomar || NEAT || — || align=right | 1.7 km || 
|-id=016 bgcolor=#fefefe
| 156016 ||  || — || September 11, 2001 || Anderson Mesa || LONEOS || — || align=right | 1.7 km || 
|-id=017 bgcolor=#fefefe
| 156017 ||  || — || September 11, 2001 || Anderson Mesa || LONEOS || NYS || align=right | 1.1 km || 
|-id=018 bgcolor=#fefefe
| 156018 ||  || — || September 11, 2001 || Anderson Mesa || LONEOS || — || align=right | 1.6 km || 
|-id=019 bgcolor=#fefefe
| 156019 ||  || — || September 11, 2001 || Anderson Mesa || LONEOS || — || align=right | 1.6 km || 
|-id=020 bgcolor=#fefefe
| 156020 ||  || — || September 12, 2001 || Socorro || LINEAR || NYS || align=right | 1.3 km || 
|-id=021 bgcolor=#fefefe
| 156021 ||  || — || September 12, 2001 || Socorro || LINEAR || NYS || align=right data-sort-value="0.96" | 960 m || 
|-id=022 bgcolor=#fefefe
| 156022 ||  || — || September 12, 2001 || Socorro || LINEAR || — || align=right | 1.3 km || 
|-id=023 bgcolor=#fefefe
| 156023 ||  || — || September 12, 2001 || Socorro || LINEAR || — || align=right | 1.3 km || 
|-id=024 bgcolor=#fefefe
| 156024 ||  || — || September 12, 2001 || Socorro || LINEAR || V || align=right | 1.2 km || 
|-id=025 bgcolor=#fefefe
| 156025 ||  || — || September 12, 2001 || Socorro || LINEAR || NYS || align=right | 1.2 km || 
|-id=026 bgcolor=#fefefe
| 156026 ||  || — || September 12, 2001 || Socorro || LINEAR || — || align=right | 1.1 km || 
|-id=027 bgcolor=#fefefe
| 156027 ||  || — || September 12, 2001 || Socorro || LINEAR || FLO || align=right | 1.3 km || 
|-id=028 bgcolor=#fefefe
| 156028 ||  || — || September 12, 2001 || Socorro || LINEAR || MAS || align=right | 1.4 km || 
|-id=029 bgcolor=#fefefe
| 156029 ||  || — || September 12, 2001 || Socorro || LINEAR || FLO || align=right | 1.2 km || 
|-id=030 bgcolor=#fefefe
| 156030 ||  || — || September 12, 2001 || Socorro || LINEAR || EUT || align=right | 1.2 km || 
|-id=031 bgcolor=#fefefe
| 156031 ||  || — || September 12, 2001 || Socorro || LINEAR || — || align=right | 1.5 km || 
|-id=032 bgcolor=#FA8072
| 156032 ||  || — || September 10, 2001 || Palomar || NEAT || — || align=right | 1.6 km || 
|-id=033 bgcolor=#fefefe
| 156033 ||  || — || September 10, 2001 || Palomar || NEAT || V || align=right | 1.4 km || 
|-id=034 bgcolor=#fefefe
| 156034 ||  || — || September 11, 2001 || Anderson Mesa || LONEOS || — || align=right | 1.4 km || 
|-id=035 bgcolor=#fefefe
| 156035 ||  || — || September 11, 2001 || Kitt Peak || Spacewatch || V || align=right data-sort-value="0.97" | 970 m || 
|-id=036 bgcolor=#fefefe
| 156036 || 2001 SD || — || September 16, 2001 || Emerald Lane || L. Ball || NYS || align=right | 1.1 km || 
|-id=037 bgcolor=#fefefe
| 156037 || 2001 SQ || — || September 16, 2001 || Fountain Hills || C. W. Juels, P. R. Holvorcem || — || align=right | 2.0 km || 
|-id=038 bgcolor=#fefefe
| 156038 ||  || — || September 17, 2001 || Desert Eagle || W. K. Y. Yeung || CLA || align=right | 2.9 km || 
|-id=039 bgcolor=#fefefe
| 156039 ||  || — || September 18, 2001 || Goodricke-Pigott || R. A. Tucker || NYS || align=right | 1.3 km || 
|-id=040 bgcolor=#fefefe
| 156040 ||  || — || September 18, 2001 || Kitt Peak || Spacewatch || — || align=right | 1.6 km || 
|-id=041 bgcolor=#fefefe
| 156041 ||  || — || September 18, 2001 || Desert Eagle || W. K. Y. Yeung || — || align=right | 1.8 km || 
|-id=042 bgcolor=#fefefe
| 156042 ||  || — || September 16, 2001 || Socorro || LINEAR || V || align=right | 1.0 km || 
|-id=043 bgcolor=#fefefe
| 156043 ||  || — || September 16, 2001 || Socorro || LINEAR || NYS || align=right | 2.6 km || 
|-id=044 bgcolor=#d6d6d6
| 156044 ||  || — || September 16, 2001 || Socorro || LINEAR || 3:2 || align=right | 8.3 km || 
|-id=045 bgcolor=#fefefe
| 156045 ||  || — || September 16, 2001 || Socorro || LINEAR || — || align=right | 1.4 km || 
|-id=046 bgcolor=#fefefe
| 156046 ||  || — || September 16, 2001 || Socorro || LINEAR || V || align=right | 1.3 km || 
|-id=047 bgcolor=#fefefe
| 156047 ||  || — || September 16, 2001 || Socorro || LINEAR || — || align=right | 1.2 km || 
|-id=048 bgcolor=#fefefe
| 156048 ||  || — || September 16, 2001 || Socorro || LINEAR || — || align=right | 1.4 km || 
|-id=049 bgcolor=#fefefe
| 156049 ||  || — || September 16, 2001 || Socorro || LINEAR || — || align=right | 1.4 km || 
|-id=050 bgcolor=#fefefe
| 156050 ||  || — || September 16, 2001 || Socorro || LINEAR || — || align=right | 1.8 km || 
|-id=051 bgcolor=#fefefe
| 156051 ||  || — || September 16, 2001 || Socorro || LINEAR || V || align=right | 1.3 km || 
|-id=052 bgcolor=#fefefe
| 156052 ||  || — || September 16, 2001 || Socorro || LINEAR || — || align=right | 1.4 km || 
|-id=053 bgcolor=#fefefe
| 156053 ||  || — || September 16, 2001 || Socorro || LINEAR || V || align=right | 1.3 km || 
|-id=054 bgcolor=#E9E9E9
| 156054 ||  || — || September 16, 2001 || Socorro || LINEAR || RAF || align=right | 1.5 km || 
|-id=055 bgcolor=#fefefe
| 156055 ||  || — || September 16, 2001 || Socorro || LINEAR || FLO || align=right | 1.4 km || 
|-id=056 bgcolor=#fefefe
| 156056 ||  || — || September 16, 2001 || Socorro || LINEAR || — || align=right | 1.8 km || 
|-id=057 bgcolor=#fefefe
| 156057 ||  || — || September 16, 2001 || Socorro || LINEAR || — || align=right | 1.6 km || 
|-id=058 bgcolor=#fefefe
| 156058 ||  || — || September 16, 2001 || Socorro || LINEAR || — || align=right | 1.8 km || 
|-id=059 bgcolor=#fefefe
| 156059 ||  || — || September 17, 2001 || Socorro || LINEAR || — || align=right | 1.5 km || 
|-id=060 bgcolor=#fefefe
| 156060 ||  || — || September 17, 2001 || Socorro || LINEAR || — || align=right | 1.5 km || 
|-id=061 bgcolor=#fefefe
| 156061 ||  || — || September 17, 2001 || Socorro || LINEAR || V || align=right | 1.5 km || 
|-id=062 bgcolor=#fefefe
| 156062 ||  || — || September 17, 2001 || Socorro || LINEAR || — || align=right | 1.5 km || 
|-id=063 bgcolor=#fefefe
| 156063 ||  || — || September 17, 2001 || Socorro || LINEAR || V || align=right | 1.0 km || 
|-id=064 bgcolor=#fefefe
| 156064 ||  || — || September 17, 2001 || Socorro || LINEAR || V || align=right data-sort-value="0.99" | 990 m || 
|-id=065 bgcolor=#fefefe
| 156065 ||  || — || September 17, 2001 || Socorro || LINEAR || FLO || align=right | 1.3 km || 
|-id=066 bgcolor=#fefefe
| 156066 ||  || — || September 19, 2001 || Bisei SG Center || BATTeRS || — || align=right | 2.2 km || 
|-id=067 bgcolor=#fefefe
| 156067 ||  || — || September 20, 2001 || Socorro || LINEAR || — || align=right | 1.2 km || 
|-id=068 bgcolor=#fefefe
| 156068 ||  || — || September 20, 2001 || Socorro || LINEAR || — || align=right | 1.2 km || 
|-id=069 bgcolor=#fefefe
| 156069 ||  || — || September 20, 2001 || Socorro || LINEAR || — || align=right | 1.3 km || 
|-id=070 bgcolor=#fefefe
| 156070 ||  || — || September 20, 2001 || Socorro || LINEAR || — || align=right | 1.4 km || 
|-id=071 bgcolor=#fefefe
| 156071 ||  || — || September 20, 2001 || Socorro || LINEAR || — || align=right | 1.8 km || 
|-id=072 bgcolor=#E9E9E9
| 156072 ||  || — || September 18, 2001 || Desert Eagle || W. K. Y. Yeung || MIT || align=right | 4.7 km || 
|-id=073 bgcolor=#fefefe
| 156073 ||  || — || September 16, 2001 || Socorro || LINEAR || V || align=right | 1.1 km || 
|-id=074 bgcolor=#fefefe
| 156074 ||  || — || September 16, 2001 || Socorro || LINEAR || CLA || align=right | 3.7 km || 
|-id=075 bgcolor=#fefefe
| 156075 ||  || — || September 16, 2001 || Socorro || LINEAR || MAS || align=right | 1.3 km || 
|-id=076 bgcolor=#fefefe
| 156076 ||  || — || September 16, 2001 || Socorro || LINEAR || NYS || align=right | 1.2 km || 
|-id=077 bgcolor=#fefefe
| 156077 ||  || — || September 16, 2001 || Socorro || LINEAR || — || align=right | 1.2 km || 
|-id=078 bgcolor=#fefefe
| 156078 ||  || — || September 17, 2001 || Socorro || LINEAR || — || align=right | 2.4 km || 
|-id=079 bgcolor=#fefefe
| 156079 ||  || — || September 17, 2001 || Socorro || LINEAR || NYS || align=right | 1.2 km || 
|-id=080 bgcolor=#fefefe
| 156080 ||  || — || September 17, 2001 || Socorro || LINEAR || — || align=right | 1.4 km || 
|-id=081 bgcolor=#fefefe
| 156081 ||  || — || September 17, 2001 || Socorro || LINEAR || — || align=right | 1.9 km || 
|-id=082 bgcolor=#fefefe
| 156082 ||  || — || September 19, 2001 || Socorro || LINEAR || V || align=right data-sort-value="0.93" | 930 m || 
|-id=083 bgcolor=#fefefe
| 156083 ||  || — || September 19, 2001 || Socorro || LINEAR || V || align=right | 1.2 km || 
|-id=084 bgcolor=#fefefe
| 156084 ||  || — || September 19, 2001 || Socorro || LINEAR || — || align=right | 1.3 km || 
|-id=085 bgcolor=#d6d6d6
| 156085 ||  || — || September 19, 2001 || Socorro || LINEAR || 3:2 || align=right | 7.3 km || 
|-id=086 bgcolor=#fefefe
| 156086 ||  || — || September 19, 2001 || Socorro || LINEAR || NYS || align=right data-sort-value="0.94" | 940 m || 
|-id=087 bgcolor=#fefefe
| 156087 ||  || — || September 19, 2001 || Socorro || LINEAR || NYS || align=right | 1.2 km || 
|-id=088 bgcolor=#fefefe
| 156088 ||  || — || September 19, 2001 || Socorro || LINEAR || NYS || align=right data-sort-value="0.78" | 780 m || 
|-id=089 bgcolor=#fefefe
| 156089 ||  || — || September 19, 2001 || Socorro || LINEAR || — || align=right | 1.2 km || 
|-id=090 bgcolor=#fefefe
| 156090 ||  || — || September 19, 2001 || Socorro || LINEAR || MAS || align=right | 1.6 km || 
|-id=091 bgcolor=#fefefe
| 156091 ||  || — || September 19, 2001 || Socorro || LINEAR || V || align=right | 1.0 km || 
|-id=092 bgcolor=#fefefe
| 156092 ||  || — || September 19, 2001 || Socorro || LINEAR || — || align=right | 1.2 km || 
|-id=093 bgcolor=#fefefe
| 156093 ||  || — || September 19, 2001 || Socorro || LINEAR || NYS || align=right data-sort-value="0.98" | 980 m || 
|-id=094 bgcolor=#fefefe
| 156094 ||  || — || September 19, 2001 || Socorro || LINEAR || — || align=right data-sort-value="0.97" | 970 m || 
|-id=095 bgcolor=#fefefe
| 156095 ||  || — || September 19, 2001 || Socorro || LINEAR || MAS || align=right | 1.1 km || 
|-id=096 bgcolor=#fefefe
| 156096 ||  || — || September 19, 2001 || Socorro || LINEAR || — || align=right | 1.2 km || 
|-id=097 bgcolor=#fefefe
| 156097 ||  || — || September 19, 2001 || Socorro || LINEAR || NYS || align=right | 1.5 km || 
|-id=098 bgcolor=#C2FFFF
| 156098 ||  || — || September 19, 2001 || Socorro || LINEAR || L5 || align=right | 11 km || 
|-id=099 bgcolor=#fefefe
| 156099 ||  || — || September 19, 2001 || Socorro || LINEAR || — || align=right | 1.5 km || 
|-id=100 bgcolor=#fefefe
| 156100 ||  || — || September 19, 2001 || Socorro || LINEAR || V || align=right | 1.4 km || 
|}

156101–156200 

|-bgcolor=#fefefe
| 156101 ||  || — || September 19, 2001 || Socorro || LINEAR || NYS || align=right | 1.1 km || 
|-id=102 bgcolor=#fefefe
| 156102 ||  || — || September 19, 2001 || Socorro || LINEAR || MAS || align=right | 1.3 km || 
|-id=103 bgcolor=#fefefe
| 156103 ||  || — || September 19, 2001 || Socorro || LINEAR || NYS || align=right | 1.3 km || 
|-id=104 bgcolor=#fefefe
| 156104 ||  || — || September 19, 2001 || Socorro || LINEAR || FLO || align=right | 1.4 km || 
|-id=105 bgcolor=#fefefe
| 156105 ||  || — || September 19, 2001 || Socorro || LINEAR || — || align=right | 1.4 km || 
|-id=106 bgcolor=#fefefe
| 156106 ||  || — || September 19, 2001 || Socorro || LINEAR || — || align=right | 1.3 km || 
|-id=107 bgcolor=#fefefe
| 156107 ||  || — || September 19, 2001 || Socorro || LINEAR || — || align=right | 1.4 km || 
|-id=108 bgcolor=#fefefe
| 156108 ||  || — || September 19, 2001 || Socorro || LINEAR || — || align=right | 1.4 km || 
|-id=109 bgcolor=#fefefe
| 156109 ||  || — || September 19, 2001 || Socorro || LINEAR || — || align=right | 1.5 km || 
|-id=110 bgcolor=#fefefe
| 156110 ||  || — || September 19, 2001 || Socorro || LINEAR || V || align=right | 1.4 km || 
|-id=111 bgcolor=#fefefe
| 156111 ||  || — || September 19, 2001 || Socorro || LINEAR || FLO || align=right data-sort-value="0.91" | 910 m || 
|-id=112 bgcolor=#fefefe
| 156112 ||  || — || September 19, 2001 || Socorro || LINEAR || — || align=right | 2.3 km || 
|-id=113 bgcolor=#fefefe
| 156113 ||  || — || September 25, 2001 || Desert Eagle || W. K. Y. Yeung || — || align=right | 1.4 km || 
|-id=114 bgcolor=#E9E9E9
| 156114 ||  || — || September 25, 2001 || Desert Eagle || W. K. Y. Yeung || — || align=right | 1.8 km || 
|-id=115 bgcolor=#fefefe
| 156115 ||  || — || September 21, 2001 || Kitt Peak || Spacewatch || FLO || align=right data-sort-value="0.77" | 770 m || 
|-id=116 bgcolor=#fefefe
| 156116 ||  || — || September 21, 2001 || Anderson Mesa || LONEOS || MAS || align=right | 1.4 km || 
|-id=117 bgcolor=#fefefe
| 156117 ||  || — || September 28, 2001 || Palomar || NEAT || FLO || align=right | 1.4 km || 
|-id=118 bgcolor=#fefefe
| 156118 ||  || — || September 20, 2001 || Socorro || LINEAR || — || align=right | 1.3 km || 
|-id=119 bgcolor=#E9E9E9
| 156119 ||  || — || September 20, 2001 || Socorro || LINEAR || — || align=right | 1.5 km || 
|-id=120 bgcolor=#fefefe
| 156120 ||  || — || September 20, 2001 || Socorro || LINEAR || NYS || align=right | 1.1 km || 
|-id=121 bgcolor=#fefefe
| 156121 ||  || — || September 20, 2001 || Socorro || LINEAR || NYS || align=right | 3.2 km || 
|-id=122 bgcolor=#fefefe
| 156122 ||  || — || September 18, 2001 || Anderson Mesa || LONEOS || FLO || align=right | 1.1 km || 
|-id=123 bgcolor=#C2FFFF
| 156123 ||  || — || September 20, 2001 || Socorro || LINEAR || L5 || align=right | 12 km || 
|-id=124 bgcolor=#fefefe
| 156124 ||  || — || September 23, 2001 || Palomar || NEAT || — || align=right | 1.4 km || 
|-id=125 bgcolor=#C2FFFF
| 156125 ||  || — || September 25, 2001 || Socorro || LINEAR || L5 || align=right | 18 km || 
|-id=126 bgcolor=#fefefe
| 156126 ||  || — || September 20, 2001 || Kitt Peak || Spacewatch || — || align=right | 1.1 km || 
|-id=127 bgcolor=#E9E9E9
| 156127 ||  || — || October 11, 2001 || Desert Eagle || W. K. Y. Yeung || — || align=right | 1.6 km || 
|-id=128 bgcolor=#fefefe
| 156128 ||  || — || October 7, 2001 || Palomar || NEAT || NYS || align=right data-sort-value="0.97" | 970 m || 
|-id=129 bgcolor=#fefefe
| 156129 ||  || — || October 10, 2001 || Palomar || NEAT || KLI || align=right | 3.1 km || 
|-id=130 bgcolor=#fefefe
| 156130 ||  || — || October 13, 2001 || Socorro || LINEAR || NYS || align=right | 1.3 km || 
|-id=131 bgcolor=#fefefe
| 156131 ||  || — || October 10, 2001 || Palomar || NEAT || — || align=right | 1.8 km || 
|-id=132 bgcolor=#fefefe
| 156132 ||  || — || October 10, 2001 || Palomar || NEAT || V || align=right | 1.3 km || 
|-id=133 bgcolor=#fefefe
| 156133 ||  || — || October 14, 2001 || Socorro || LINEAR || — || align=right | 1.3 km || 
|-id=134 bgcolor=#E9E9E9
| 156134 ||  || — || October 14, 2001 || Socorro || LINEAR || — || align=right | 2.6 km || 
|-id=135 bgcolor=#E9E9E9
| 156135 ||  || — || October 14, 2001 || Socorro || LINEAR || EUN || align=right | 2.3 km || 
|-id=136 bgcolor=#fefefe
| 156136 ||  || — || October 14, 2001 || Socorro || LINEAR || V || align=right | 1.5 km || 
|-id=137 bgcolor=#fefefe
| 156137 ||  || — || October 14, 2001 || Socorro || LINEAR || — || align=right | 1.5 km || 
|-id=138 bgcolor=#E9E9E9
| 156138 ||  || — || October 14, 2001 || Socorro || LINEAR || — || align=right | 2.8 km || 
|-id=139 bgcolor=#E9E9E9
| 156139 ||  || — || October 14, 2001 || Socorro || LINEAR || — || align=right | 3.6 km || 
|-id=140 bgcolor=#E9E9E9
| 156140 ||  || — || October 14, 2001 || Socorro || LINEAR || — || align=right | 2.4 km || 
|-id=141 bgcolor=#fefefe
| 156141 ||  || — || October 13, 2001 || Socorro || LINEAR || V || align=right data-sort-value="0.94" | 940 m || 
|-id=142 bgcolor=#fefefe
| 156142 ||  || — || October 13, 2001 || Socorro || LINEAR || MAS || align=right | 1.4 km || 
|-id=143 bgcolor=#fefefe
| 156143 ||  || — || October 13, 2001 || Socorro || LINEAR || — || align=right | 2.3 km || 
|-id=144 bgcolor=#fefefe
| 156144 ||  || — || October 13, 2001 || Socorro || LINEAR || NYS || align=right | 1.6 km || 
|-id=145 bgcolor=#fefefe
| 156145 ||  || — || October 13, 2001 || Socorro || LINEAR || NYS || align=right | 1.1 km || 
|-id=146 bgcolor=#fefefe
| 156146 ||  || — || October 13, 2001 || Socorro || LINEAR || V || align=right | 1.3 km || 
|-id=147 bgcolor=#fefefe
| 156147 ||  || — || October 13, 2001 || Socorro || LINEAR || — || align=right | 3.0 km || 
|-id=148 bgcolor=#fefefe
| 156148 ||  || — || October 13, 2001 || Socorro || LINEAR || V || align=right | 1.3 km || 
|-id=149 bgcolor=#fefefe
| 156149 ||  || — || October 13, 2001 || Socorro || LINEAR || — || align=right | 1.6 km || 
|-id=150 bgcolor=#fefefe
| 156150 ||  || — || October 13, 2001 || Socorro || LINEAR || ERI || align=right | 2.7 km || 
|-id=151 bgcolor=#fefefe
| 156151 ||  || — || October 13, 2001 || Socorro || LINEAR || — || align=right | 1.5 km || 
|-id=152 bgcolor=#fefefe
| 156152 ||  || — || October 13, 2001 || Socorro || LINEAR || NYS || align=right | 1.8 km || 
|-id=153 bgcolor=#fefefe
| 156153 ||  || — || October 13, 2001 || Socorro || LINEAR || — || align=right | 3.7 km || 
|-id=154 bgcolor=#E9E9E9
| 156154 ||  || — || October 14, 2001 || Socorro || LINEAR || — || align=right | 1.8 km || 
|-id=155 bgcolor=#E9E9E9
| 156155 ||  || — || October 14, 2001 || Socorro || LINEAR || — || align=right | 1.7 km || 
|-id=156 bgcolor=#fefefe
| 156156 ||  || — || October 14, 2001 || Socorro || LINEAR || — || align=right | 2.6 km || 
|-id=157 bgcolor=#fefefe
| 156157 ||  || — || October 14, 2001 || Socorro || LINEAR || — || align=right | 1.1 km || 
|-id=158 bgcolor=#E9E9E9
| 156158 ||  || — || October 14, 2001 || Socorro || LINEAR || — || align=right | 1.4 km || 
|-id=159 bgcolor=#E9E9E9
| 156159 ||  || — || October 15, 2001 || Desert Eagle || W. K. Y. Yeung || — || align=right | 2.1 km || 
|-id=160 bgcolor=#fefefe
| 156160 ||  || — || October 13, 2001 || Socorro || LINEAR || V || align=right | 1.1 km || 
|-id=161 bgcolor=#fefefe
| 156161 ||  || — || October 14, 2001 || Socorro || LINEAR || — || align=right | 1.4 km || 
|-id=162 bgcolor=#fefefe
| 156162 ||  || — || October 14, 2001 || Socorro || LINEAR || — || align=right | 1.5 km || 
|-id=163 bgcolor=#fefefe
| 156163 ||  || — || October 14, 2001 || Socorro || LINEAR || — || align=right | 1.8 km || 
|-id=164 bgcolor=#E9E9E9
| 156164 ||  || — || October 14, 2001 || Socorro || LINEAR || — || align=right | 2.7 km || 
|-id=165 bgcolor=#fefefe
| 156165 ||  || — || October 11, 2001 || Palomar || NEAT || — || align=right | 5.4 km || 
|-id=166 bgcolor=#fefefe
| 156166 ||  || — || October 12, 2001 || Haleakala || NEAT || V || align=right | 1.2 km || 
|-id=167 bgcolor=#fefefe
| 156167 ||  || — || October 13, 2001 || Palomar || NEAT || — || align=right | 1.9 km || 
|-id=168 bgcolor=#fefefe
| 156168 ||  || — || October 10, 2001 || Palomar || NEAT || V || align=right | 1.2 km || 
|-id=169 bgcolor=#fefefe
| 156169 ||  || — || October 10, 2001 || Palomar || NEAT || — || align=right | 1.6 km || 
|-id=170 bgcolor=#fefefe
| 156170 ||  || — || October 10, 2001 || Palomar || NEAT || — || align=right | 1.4 km || 
|-id=171 bgcolor=#fefefe
| 156171 ||  || — || October 10, 2001 || Palomar || NEAT || V || align=right | 1.3 km || 
|-id=172 bgcolor=#fefefe
| 156172 ||  || — || October 11, 2001 || Palomar || NEAT || MAS || align=right data-sort-value="0.88" | 880 m || 
|-id=173 bgcolor=#E9E9E9
| 156173 ||  || — || October 11, 2001 || Palomar || NEAT || — || align=right | 1.1 km || 
|-id=174 bgcolor=#E9E9E9
| 156174 ||  || — || October 11, 2001 || Palomar || NEAT || — || align=right | 2.0 km || 
|-id=175 bgcolor=#fefefe
| 156175 ||  || — || October 14, 2001 || Socorro || LINEAR || NYS || align=right data-sort-value="0.96" | 960 m || 
|-id=176 bgcolor=#fefefe
| 156176 ||  || — || October 14, 2001 || Socorro || LINEAR || — || align=right | 1.1 km || 
|-id=177 bgcolor=#fefefe
| 156177 ||  || — || October 14, 2001 || Socorro || LINEAR || — || align=right | 1.4 km || 
|-id=178 bgcolor=#E9E9E9
| 156178 ||  || — || October 14, 2001 || Socorro || LINEAR || — || align=right | 3.6 km || 
|-id=179 bgcolor=#fefefe
| 156179 ||  || — || October 14, 2001 || Socorro || LINEAR || — || align=right | 1.5 km || 
|-id=180 bgcolor=#fefefe
| 156180 ||  || — || October 15, 2001 || Palomar || NEAT || — || align=right | 1.3 km || 
|-id=181 bgcolor=#fefefe
| 156181 ||  || — || October 11, 2001 || Socorro || LINEAR || V || align=right | 1.1 km || 
|-id=182 bgcolor=#fefefe
| 156182 ||  || — || October 14, 2001 || Anderson Mesa || LONEOS || V || align=right | 1.2 km || 
|-id=183 bgcolor=#fefefe
| 156183 ||  || — || October 14, 2001 || Socorro || LINEAR || — || align=right | 1.3 km || 
|-id=184 bgcolor=#fefefe
| 156184 ||  || — || October 14, 2001 || Socorro || LINEAR || FLO || align=right | 1.0 km || 
|-id=185 bgcolor=#C2FFFF
| 156185 ||  || — || October 14, 2001 || Socorro || LINEAR || L5 || align=right | 19 km || 
|-id=186 bgcolor=#fefefe
| 156186 ||  || — || October 14, 2001 || Socorro || LINEAR || FLO || align=right | 1.3 km || 
|-id=187 bgcolor=#fefefe
| 156187 ||  || — || October 15, 2001 || Palomar || NEAT || — || align=right | 1.8 km || 
|-id=188 bgcolor=#C2FFFF
| 156188 ||  || — || October 15, 2001 || Kitt Peak || Spacewatch || L5 || align=right | 15 km || 
|-id=189 bgcolor=#fefefe
| 156189 ||  || — || October 7, 2001 || Palomar || NEAT || — || align=right | 1.1 km || 
|-id=190 bgcolor=#fefefe
| 156190 ||  || — || October 8, 2001 || Palomar || NEAT || — || align=right | 2.1 km || 
|-id=191 bgcolor=#fefefe
| 156191 ||  || — || October 10, 2001 || Palomar || NEAT || FLO || align=right data-sort-value="0.94" | 940 m || 
|-id=192 bgcolor=#E9E9E9
| 156192 ||  || — || October 17, 2001 || Desert Eagle || W. K. Y. Yeung || BAR || align=right | 2.2 km || 
|-id=193 bgcolor=#fefefe
| 156193 ||  || — || October 20, 2001 || Socorro || LINEAR || — || align=right | 1.1 km || 
|-id=194 bgcolor=#fefefe
| 156194 ||  || — || October 17, 2001 || Desert Eagle || W. K. Y. Yeung || NYS || align=right | 1.0 km || 
|-id=195 bgcolor=#E9E9E9
| 156195 ||  || — || October 18, 2001 || Desert Eagle || W. K. Y. Yeung || — || align=right | 1.5 km || 
|-id=196 bgcolor=#E9E9E9
| 156196 ||  || — || October 23, 2001 || Desert Eagle || W. K. Y. Yeung || — || align=right | 2.4 km || 
|-id=197 bgcolor=#E9E9E9
| 156197 ||  || — || October 18, 2001 || Socorro || LINEAR || BAR || align=right | 1.9 km || 
|-id=198 bgcolor=#fefefe
| 156198 ||  || — || October 16, 2001 || Socorro || LINEAR || FLO || align=right data-sort-value="0.85" | 850 m || 
|-id=199 bgcolor=#fefefe
| 156199 ||  || — || October 16, 2001 || Socorro || LINEAR || V || align=right | 1.4 km || 
|-id=200 bgcolor=#fefefe
| 156200 ||  || — || October 17, 2001 || Socorro || LINEAR || NYS || align=right | 1.2 km || 
|}

156201–156300 

|-bgcolor=#fefefe
| 156201 ||  || — || October 17, 2001 || Socorro || LINEAR || V || align=right | 1.2 km || 
|-id=202 bgcolor=#fefefe
| 156202 ||  || — || October 17, 2001 || Socorro || LINEAR || NYS || align=right data-sort-value="0.79" | 790 m || 
|-id=203 bgcolor=#fefefe
| 156203 ||  || — || October 17, 2001 || Socorro || LINEAR || — || align=right | 1.5 km || 
|-id=204 bgcolor=#E9E9E9
| 156204 ||  || — || October 17, 2001 || Socorro || LINEAR || — || align=right | 1.9 km || 
|-id=205 bgcolor=#E9E9E9
| 156205 ||  || — || October 17, 2001 || Socorro || LINEAR || — || align=right | 1.1 km || 
|-id=206 bgcolor=#fefefe
| 156206 ||  || — || October 17, 2001 || Socorro || LINEAR || V || align=right | 1.4 km || 
|-id=207 bgcolor=#fefefe
| 156207 ||  || — || October 17, 2001 || Socorro || LINEAR || — || align=right | 1.3 km || 
|-id=208 bgcolor=#fefefe
| 156208 ||  || — || October 17, 2001 || Socorro || LINEAR || NYS || align=right | 1.2 km || 
|-id=209 bgcolor=#fefefe
| 156209 ||  || — || October 18, 2001 || Socorro || LINEAR || — || align=right | 1.2 km || 
|-id=210 bgcolor=#C2FFFF
| 156210 ||  || — || October 17, 2001 || Socorro || LINEAR || L5 || align=right | 18 km || 
|-id=211 bgcolor=#fefefe
| 156211 ||  || — || October 17, 2001 || Socorro || LINEAR || V || align=right | 1.1 km || 
|-id=212 bgcolor=#fefefe
| 156212 ||  || — || October 17, 2001 || Socorro || LINEAR || — || align=right | 1.1 km || 
|-id=213 bgcolor=#fefefe
| 156213 ||  || — || October 17, 2001 || Socorro || LINEAR || — || align=right | 1.2 km || 
|-id=214 bgcolor=#E9E9E9
| 156214 ||  || — || October 18, 2001 || Socorro || LINEAR || — || align=right | 4.1 km || 
|-id=215 bgcolor=#E9E9E9
| 156215 ||  || — || October 20, 2001 || Haleakala || NEAT || — || align=right | 1.9 km || 
|-id=216 bgcolor=#E9E9E9
| 156216 ||  || — || October 17, 2001 || Socorro || LINEAR || — || align=right | 1.6 km || 
|-id=217 bgcolor=#fefefe
| 156217 ||  || — || October 17, 2001 || Socorro || LINEAR || — || align=right | 1.2 km || 
|-id=218 bgcolor=#fefefe
| 156218 ||  || — || October 17, 2001 || Socorro || LINEAR || NYS || align=right | 1.1 km || 
|-id=219 bgcolor=#E9E9E9
| 156219 ||  || — || October 17, 2001 || Socorro || LINEAR || — || align=right | 1.6 km || 
|-id=220 bgcolor=#fefefe
| 156220 ||  || — || October 17, 2001 || Socorro || LINEAR || V || align=right | 1.1 km || 
|-id=221 bgcolor=#fefefe
| 156221 ||  || — || October 20, 2001 || Socorro || LINEAR || — || align=right | 2.4 km || 
|-id=222 bgcolor=#C2FFFF
| 156222 ||  || — || October 23, 2001 || Kitt Peak || Spacewatch || L5 || align=right | 10 km || 
|-id=223 bgcolor=#fefefe
| 156223 ||  || — || October 19, 2001 || Palomar || NEAT || FLO || align=right data-sort-value="0.95" | 950 m || 
|-id=224 bgcolor=#fefefe
| 156224 ||  || — || October 17, 2001 || Socorro || LINEAR || — || align=right | 1.5 km || 
|-id=225 bgcolor=#fefefe
| 156225 ||  || — || October 17, 2001 || Socorro || LINEAR || — || align=right | 1.6 km || 
|-id=226 bgcolor=#fefefe
| 156226 ||  || — || October 17, 2001 || Socorro || LINEAR || NYS || align=right | 1.2 km || 
|-id=227 bgcolor=#fefefe
| 156227 ||  || — || October 20, 2001 || Socorro || LINEAR || V || align=right | 1.1 km || 
|-id=228 bgcolor=#fefefe
| 156228 ||  || — || October 22, 2001 || Socorro || LINEAR || — || align=right | 1.6 km || 
|-id=229 bgcolor=#fefefe
| 156229 ||  || — || October 22, 2001 || Socorro || LINEAR || — || align=right | 2.2 km || 
|-id=230 bgcolor=#fefefe
| 156230 ||  || — || October 22, 2001 || Socorro || LINEAR || — || align=right | 1.7 km || 
|-id=231 bgcolor=#fefefe
| 156231 ||  || — || October 22, 2001 || Socorro || LINEAR || — || align=right | 1.6 km || 
|-id=232 bgcolor=#E9E9E9
| 156232 ||  || — || October 17, 2001 || Socorro || LINEAR || — || align=right | 4.8 km || 
|-id=233 bgcolor=#fefefe
| 156233 ||  || — || October 20, 2001 || Socorro || LINEAR || — || align=right | 1.4 km || 
|-id=234 bgcolor=#fefefe
| 156234 ||  || — || October 23, 2001 || Socorro || LINEAR || — || align=right | 1.2 km || 
|-id=235 bgcolor=#E9E9E9
| 156235 ||  || — || October 23, 2001 || Socorro || LINEAR || — || align=right | 1.6 km || 
|-id=236 bgcolor=#fefefe
| 156236 ||  || — || October 23, 2001 || Socorro || LINEAR || — || align=right | 1.3 km || 
|-id=237 bgcolor=#C2FFFF
| 156237 ||  || — || October 23, 2001 || Socorro || LINEAR || L5 || align=right | 11 km || 
|-id=238 bgcolor=#fefefe
| 156238 ||  || — || October 23, 2001 || Socorro || LINEAR || NYS || align=right | 1.1 km || 
|-id=239 bgcolor=#fefefe
| 156239 ||  || — || October 23, 2001 || Socorro || LINEAR || NYS || align=right | 1.2 km || 
|-id=240 bgcolor=#E9E9E9
| 156240 ||  || — || October 23, 2001 || Socorro || LINEAR || — || align=right | 1.3 km || 
|-id=241 bgcolor=#fefefe
| 156241 ||  || — || October 23, 2001 || Socorro || LINEAR || V || align=right | 1.1 km || 
|-id=242 bgcolor=#fefefe
| 156242 ||  || — || October 23, 2001 || Socorro || LINEAR || — || align=right | 3.5 km || 
|-id=243 bgcolor=#fefefe
| 156243 ||  || — || October 23, 2001 || Socorro || LINEAR || V || align=right | 1.1 km || 
|-id=244 bgcolor=#fefefe
| 156244 ||  || — || October 21, 2001 || Socorro || LINEAR || — || align=right | 1.2 km || 
|-id=245 bgcolor=#fefefe
| 156245 ||  || — || October 18, 2001 || Palomar || NEAT || — || align=right | 2.7 km || 
|-id=246 bgcolor=#E9E9E9
| 156246 ||  || — || October 18, 2001 || Palomar || NEAT || — || align=right | 1.2 km || 
|-id=247 bgcolor=#fefefe
| 156247 ||  || — || October 26, 2001 || Palomar || NEAT || — || align=right | 1.6 km || 
|-id=248 bgcolor=#fefefe
| 156248 ||  || — || October 17, 2001 || Kitt Peak || Spacewatch || — || align=right | 1.2 km || 
|-id=249 bgcolor=#fefefe
| 156249 ||  || — || October 18, 2001 || Palomar || NEAT || — || align=right | 1.3 km || 
|-id=250 bgcolor=#C2FFFF
| 156250 ||  || — || October 19, 2001 || Palomar || NEAT || L5 || align=right | 10 km || 
|-id=251 bgcolor=#fefefe
| 156251 ||  || — || October 19, 2001 || Palomar || NEAT || NYS || align=right | 1.3 km || 
|-id=252 bgcolor=#C2FFFF
| 156252 ||  || — || October 19, 2001 || Palomar || NEAT || L5 || align=right | 12 km || 
|-id=253 bgcolor=#fefefe
| 156253 ||  || — || October 24, 2001 || Socorro || LINEAR || — || align=right | 1.1 km || 
|-id=254 bgcolor=#fefefe
| 156254 ||  || — || October 24, 2001 || Socorro || LINEAR || — || align=right | 1.3 km || 
|-id=255 bgcolor=#E9E9E9
| 156255 ||  || — || October 21, 2001 || Kitt Peak || Spacewatch || — || align=right | 1.2 km || 
|-id=256 bgcolor=#fefefe
| 156256 ||  || — || November 9, 2001 || Socorro || LINEAR || — || align=right | 1.6 km || 
|-id=257 bgcolor=#fefefe
| 156257 ||  || — || November 10, 2001 || Socorro || LINEAR || — || align=right | 3.6 km || 
|-id=258 bgcolor=#fefefe
| 156258 ||  || — || November 10, 2001 || Socorro || LINEAR || — || align=right | 2.5 km || 
|-id=259 bgcolor=#fefefe
| 156259 ||  || — || November 9, 2001 || Socorro || LINEAR || MAS || align=right | 1.1 km || 
|-id=260 bgcolor=#fefefe
| 156260 ||  || — || November 9, 2001 || Socorro || LINEAR || NYS || align=right | 1.2 km || 
|-id=261 bgcolor=#E9E9E9
| 156261 ||  || — || November 9, 2001 || Socorro || LINEAR || — || align=right | 1.3 km || 
|-id=262 bgcolor=#fefefe
| 156262 ||  || — || November 9, 2001 || Socorro || LINEAR || MAS || align=right | 1.3 km || 
|-id=263 bgcolor=#fefefe
| 156263 ||  || — || November 9, 2001 || Socorro || LINEAR || — || align=right | 1.3 km || 
|-id=264 bgcolor=#E9E9E9
| 156264 ||  || — || November 9, 2001 || Socorro || LINEAR || — || align=right | 4.0 km || 
|-id=265 bgcolor=#E9E9E9
| 156265 ||  || — || November 9, 2001 || Socorro || LINEAR || — || align=right | 1.3 km || 
|-id=266 bgcolor=#E9E9E9
| 156266 ||  || — || November 9, 2001 || Socorro || LINEAR || — || align=right | 1.6 km || 
|-id=267 bgcolor=#fefefe
| 156267 ||  || — || November 9, 2001 || Socorro || LINEAR || NYS || align=right | 1.2 km || 
|-id=268 bgcolor=#E9E9E9
| 156268 ||  || — || November 9, 2001 || Socorro || LINEAR || — || align=right | 2.4 km || 
|-id=269 bgcolor=#E9E9E9
| 156269 ||  || — || November 9, 2001 || Socorro || LINEAR || HNS || align=right | 2.5 km || 
|-id=270 bgcolor=#fefefe
| 156270 ||  || — || November 10, 2001 || Socorro || LINEAR || — || align=right | 1.4 km || 
|-id=271 bgcolor=#fefefe
| 156271 ||  || — || November 10, 2001 || Socorro || LINEAR || — || align=right | 1.8 km || 
|-id=272 bgcolor=#E9E9E9
| 156272 ||  || — || November 10, 2001 || Socorro || LINEAR || RAF || align=right | 1.6 km || 
|-id=273 bgcolor=#E9E9E9
| 156273 ||  || — || November 11, 2001 || Socorro || LINEAR || — || align=right | 1.7 km || 
|-id=274 bgcolor=#E9E9E9
| 156274 ||  || — || November 12, 2001 || Kvistaberg || UDAS || — || align=right | 3.5 km || 
|-id=275 bgcolor=#E9E9E9
| 156275 ||  || — || November 15, 2001 || Socorro || LINEAR || — || align=right | 2.9 km || 
|-id=276 bgcolor=#fefefe
| 156276 ||  || — || November 15, 2001 || Socorro || LINEAR || — || align=right | 1.5 km || 
|-id=277 bgcolor=#E9E9E9
| 156277 ||  || — || November 15, 2001 || Socorro || LINEAR || — || align=right | 2.5 km || 
|-id=278 bgcolor=#E9E9E9
| 156278 ||  || — || November 12, 2001 || Socorro || LINEAR || — || align=right | 1.4 km || 
|-id=279 bgcolor=#fefefe
| 156279 ||  || — || November 12, 2001 || Socorro || LINEAR || V || align=right | 1.1 km || 
|-id=280 bgcolor=#fefefe
| 156280 ||  || — || November 12, 2001 || Socorro || LINEAR || NYS || align=right | 1.2 km || 
|-id=281 bgcolor=#E9E9E9
| 156281 ||  || — || November 12, 2001 || Socorro || LINEAR || — || align=right | 3.2 km || 
|-id=282 bgcolor=#fefefe
| 156282 ||  || — || November 14, 2001 || Kitt Peak || Spacewatch || — || align=right | 1.1 km || 
|-id=283 bgcolor=#E9E9E9
| 156283 ||  || — || November 17, 2001 || Socorro || LINEAR || — || align=right | 2.0 km || 
|-id=284 bgcolor=#fefefe
| 156284 ||  || — || November 17, 2001 || Socorro || LINEAR || — || align=right | 1.5 km || 
|-id=285 bgcolor=#fefefe
| 156285 ||  || — || November 17, 2001 || Socorro || LINEAR || NYS || align=right data-sort-value="0.85" | 850 m || 
|-id=286 bgcolor=#E9E9E9
| 156286 ||  || — || November 17, 2001 || Socorro || LINEAR || — || align=right | 1.5 km || 
|-id=287 bgcolor=#fefefe
| 156287 ||  || — || November 17, 2001 || Kitt Peak || Spacewatch || V || align=right | 1.8 km || 
|-id=288 bgcolor=#fefefe
| 156288 ||  || — || November 17, 2001 || Socorro || LINEAR || NYS || align=right data-sort-value="0.99" | 990 m || 
|-id=289 bgcolor=#E9E9E9
| 156289 ||  || — || November 17, 2001 || Socorro || LINEAR || — || align=right | 1.7 km || 
|-id=290 bgcolor=#E9E9E9
| 156290 ||  || — || November 17, 2001 || Socorro || LINEAR || — || align=right | 1.5 km || 
|-id=291 bgcolor=#E9E9E9
| 156291 ||  || — || November 17, 2001 || Socorro || LINEAR || — || align=right | 2.1 km || 
|-id=292 bgcolor=#E9E9E9
| 156292 ||  || — || November 19, 2001 || Socorro || LINEAR || — || align=right | 1.7 km || 
|-id=293 bgcolor=#C2FFFF
| 156293 ||  || — || November 19, 2001 || Socorro || LINEAR || L5 || align=right | 13 km || 
|-id=294 bgcolor=#C2FFFF
| 156294 ||  || — || November 20, 2001 || Socorro || LINEAR || L5 || align=right | 12 km || 
|-id=295 bgcolor=#E9E9E9
| 156295 ||  || — || December 5, 2001 || Haleakala || NEAT || — || align=right | 3.2 km || 
|-id=296 bgcolor=#E9E9E9
| 156296 ||  || — || December 8, 2001 || Socorro || LINEAR || EUN || align=right | 1.8 km || 
|-id=297 bgcolor=#E9E9E9
| 156297 ||  || — || December 9, 2001 || Socorro || LINEAR || — || align=right | 4.5 km || 
|-id=298 bgcolor=#E9E9E9
| 156298 ||  || — || December 9, 2001 || Socorro || LINEAR || MAR || align=right | 1.8 km || 
|-id=299 bgcolor=#E9E9E9
| 156299 ||  || — || December 7, 2001 || Socorro || LINEAR || — || align=right | 3.0 km || 
|-id=300 bgcolor=#E9E9E9
| 156300 ||  || — || December 10, 2001 || Socorro || LINEAR || — || align=right | 2.3 km || 
|}

156301–156400 

|-bgcolor=#E9E9E9
| 156301 ||  || — || December 9, 2001 || Socorro || LINEAR || — || align=right | 3.4 km || 
|-id=302 bgcolor=#E9E9E9
| 156302 ||  || — || December 9, 2001 || Socorro || LINEAR || — || align=right | 2.6 km || 
|-id=303 bgcolor=#E9E9E9
| 156303 ||  || — || December 9, 2001 || Socorro || LINEAR || — || align=right | 1.7 km || 
|-id=304 bgcolor=#E9E9E9
| 156304 ||  || — || December 11, 2001 || Socorro || LINEAR || — || align=right | 2.1 km || 
|-id=305 bgcolor=#E9E9E9
| 156305 ||  || — || December 10, 2001 || Kitt Peak || Spacewatch || — || align=right | 1.4 km || 
|-id=306 bgcolor=#E9E9E9
| 156306 ||  || — || December 9, 2001 || Socorro || LINEAR || — || align=right | 3.2 km || 
|-id=307 bgcolor=#E9E9E9
| 156307 ||  || — || December 9, 2001 || Socorro || LINEAR || ADE || align=right | 3.2 km || 
|-id=308 bgcolor=#fefefe
| 156308 ||  || — || December 9, 2001 || Socorro || LINEAR || — || align=right | 1.8 km || 
|-id=309 bgcolor=#E9E9E9
| 156309 ||  || — || December 9, 2001 || Socorro || LINEAR || — || align=right | 2.5 km || 
|-id=310 bgcolor=#E9E9E9
| 156310 ||  || — || December 9, 2001 || Socorro || LINEAR || — || align=right | 2.1 km || 
|-id=311 bgcolor=#fefefe
| 156311 ||  || — || December 10, 2001 || Socorro || LINEAR || V || align=right | 1.5 km || 
|-id=312 bgcolor=#fefefe
| 156312 ||  || — || December 10, 2001 || Socorro || LINEAR || MAS || align=right | 1.4 km || 
|-id=313 bgcolor=#fefefe
| 156313 ||  || — || December 10, 2001 || Socorro || LINEAR || NYS || align=right | 1.5 km || 
|-id=314 bgcolor=#E9E9E9
| 156314 ||  || — || December 10, 2001 || Socorro || LINEAR || — || align=right | 2.9 km || 
|-id=315 bgcolor=#E9E9E9
| 156315 ||  || — || December 10, 2001 || Socorro || LINEAR || — || align=right | 3.0 km || 
|-id=316 bgcolor=#E9E9E9
| 156316 ||  || — || December 11, 2001 || Socorro || LINEAR || — || align=right | 3.3 km || 
|-id=317 bgcolor=#E9E9E9
| 156317 ||  || — || December 11, 2001 || Socorro || LINEAR || — || align=right | 1.3 km || 
|-id=318 bgcolor=#E9E9E9
| 156318 ||  || — || December 11, 2001 || Socorro || LINEAR || — || align=right | 1.8 km || 
|-id=319 bgcolor=#fefefe
| 156319 ||  || — || December 11, 2001 || Socorro || LINEAR || NYS || align=right data-sort-value="0.96" | 960 m || 
|-id=320 bgcolor=#fefefe
| 156320 ||  || — || December 11, 2001 || Socorro || LINEAR || — || align=right | 1.6 km || 
|-id=321 bgcolor=#E9E9E9
| 156321 ||  || — || December 11, 2001 || Socorro || LINEAR || — || align=right | 1.7 km || 
|-id=322 bgcolor=#E9E9E9
| 156322 ||  || — || December 11, 2001 || Socorro || LINEAR || — || align=right | 1.4 km || 
|-id=323 bgcolor=#E9E9E9
| 156323 ||  || — || December 11, 2001 || Socorro || LINEAR || — || align=right | 2.4 km || 
|-id=324 bgcolor=#E9E9E9
| 156324 ||  || — || December 11, 2001 || Socorro || LINEAR || — || align=right | 2.6 km || 
|-id=325 bgcolor=#E9E9E9
| 156325 ||  || — || December 10, 2001 || Socorro || LINEAR || EUN || align=right | 2.5 km || 
|-id=326 bgcolor=#E9E9E9
| 156326 ||  || — || December 10, 2001 || Socorro || LINEAR || — || align=right | 2.5 km || 
|-id=327 bgcolor=#E9E9E9
| 156327 ||  || — || December 10, 2001 || Socorro || LINEAR || — || align=right | 4.1 km || 
|-id=328 bgcolor=#E9E9E9
| 156328 ||  || — || December 10, 2001 || Socorro || LINEAR || — || align=right | 2.1 km || 
|-id=329 bgcolor=#E9E9E9
| 156329 ||  || — || December 11, 2001 || Socorro || LINEAR || — || align=right | 2.5 km || 
|-id=330 bgcolor=#E9E9E9
| 156330 ||  || — || December 11, 2001 || Socorro || LINEAR || ADE || align=right | 3.0 km || 
|-id=331 bgcolor=#fefefe
| 156331 ||  || — || December 13, 2001 || Socorro || LINEAR || — || align=right | 1.5 km || 
|-id=332 bgcolor=#E9E9E9
| 156332 ||  || — || December 13, 2001 || Socorro || LINEAR || — || align=right | 2.8 km || 
|-id=333 bgcolor=#E9E9E9
| 156333 ||  || — || December 14, 2001 || Socorro || LINEAR || RAF || align=right | 1.3 km || 
|-id=334 bgcolor=#E9E9E9
| 156334 ||  || — || December 14, 2001 || Socorro || LINEAR || — || align=right | 1.2 km || 
|-id=335 bgcolor=#fefefe
| 156335 ||  || — || December 14, 2001 || Socorro || LINEAR || — || align=right | 1.5 km || 
|-id=336 bgcolor=#E9E9E9
| 156336 ||  || — || December 14, 2001 || Socorro || LINEAR || — || align=right | 1.6 km || 
|-id=337 bgcolor=#fefefe
| 156337 ||  || — || December 14, 2001 || Socorro || LINEAR || — || align=right | 1.5 km || 
|-id=338 bgcolor=#E9E9E9
| 156338 ||  || — || December 14, 2001 || Socorro || LINEAR || — || align=right | 1.4 km || 
|-id=339 bgcolor=#fefefe
| 156339 ||  || — || December 14, 2001 || Socorro || LINEAR || NYS || align=right | 1.6 km || 
|-id=340 bgcolor=#fefefe
| 156340 ||  || — || December 14, 2001 || Socorro || LINEAR || — || align=right | 1.2 km || 
|-id=341 bgcolor=#E9E9E9
| 156341 ||  || — || December 14, 2001 || Socorro || LINEAR || — || align=right | 2.4 km || 
|-id=342 bgcolor=#fefefe
| 156342 ||  || — || December 14, 2001 || Socorro || LINEAR || MAS || align=right | 1.3 km || 
|-id=343 bgcolor=#E9E9E9
| 156343 ||  || — || December 14, 2001 || Socorro || LINEAR || — || align=right | 1.4 km || 
|-id=344 bgcolor=#E9E9E9
| 156344 ||  || — || December 14, 2001 || Socorro || LINEAR || EUN || align=right | 2.1 km || 
|-id=345 bgcolor=#E9E9E9
| 156345 ||  || — || December 14, 2001 || Socorro || LINEAR || — || align=right | 1.8 km || 
|-id=346 bgcolor=#E9E9E9
| 156346 ||  || — || December 14, 2001 || Socorro || LINEAR || — || align=right | 2.4 km || 
|-id=347 bgcolor=#E9E9E9
| 156347 ||  || — || December 14, 2001 || Socorro || LINEAR || — || align=right | 1.8 km || 
|-id=348 bgcolor=#E9E9E9
| 156348 ||  || — || December 14, 2001 || Socorro || LINEAR || EUN || align=right | 1.9 km || 
|-id=349 bgcolor=#E9E9E9
| 156349 ||  || — || December 14, 2001 || Socorro || LINEAR || — || align=right | 1.8 km || 
|-id=350 bgcolor=#E9E9E9
| 156350 ||  || — || December 14, 2001 || Socorro || LINEAR || WIT || align=right | 1.8 km || 
|-id=351 bgcolor=#E9E9E9
| 156351 ||  || — || December 14, 2001 || Socorro || LINEAR || HNS || align=right | 2.8 km || 
|-id=352 bgcolor=#E9E9E9
| 156352 ||  || — || December 14, 2001 || Socorro || LINEAR || — || align=right | 1.9 km || 
|-id=353 bgcolor=#E9E9E9
| 156353 ||  || — || December 14, 2001 || Socorro || LINEAR || — || align=right | 2.2 km || 
|-id=354 bgcolor=#E9E9E9
| 156354 ||  || — || December 11, 2001 || Socorro || LINEAR || — || align=right | 2.2 km || 
|-id=355 bgcolor=#E9E9E9
| 156355 ||  || — || December 11, 2001 || Socorro || LINEAR || — || align=right | 2.0 km || 
|-id=356 bgcolor=#fefefe
| 156356 ||  || — || December 11, 2001 || Socorro || LINEAR || — || align=right | 1.4 km || 
|-id=357 bgcolor=#E9E9E9
| 156357 ||  || — || December 11, 2001 || Socorro || LINEAR || — || align=right | 2.1 km || 
|-id=358 bgcolor=#E9E9E9
| 156358 ||  || — || December 11, 2001 || Socorro || LINEAR || — || align=right | 3.9 km || 
|-id=359 bgcolor=#E9E9E9
| 156359 ||  || — || December 13, 2001 || Socorro || LINEAR || — || align=right | 1.5 km || 
|-id=360 bgcolor=#E9E9E9
| 156360 ||  || — || December 14, 2001 || Socorro || LINEAR || — || align=right | 1.6 km || 
|-id=361 bgcolor=#E9E9E9
| 156361 ||  || — || December 14, 2001 || Socorro || LINEAR || — || align=right | 1.7 km || 
|-id=362 bgcolor=#fefefe
| 156362 ||  || — || December 15, 2001 || Socorro || LINEAR || MAS || align=right | 1.3 km || 
|-id=363 bgcolor=#fefefe
| 156363 ||  || — || December 15, 2001 || Socorro || LINEAR || — || align=right | 1.7 km || 
|-id=364 bgcolor=#fefefe
| 156364 ||  || — || December 15, 2001 || Socorro || LINEAR || MAS || align=right | 1.1 km || 
|-id=365 bgcolor=#E9E9E9
| 156365 ||  || — || December 15, 2001 || Socorro || LINEAR || — || align=right | 1.8 km || 
|-id=366 bgcolor=#fefefe
| 156366 ||  || — || December 15, 2001 || Socorro || LINEAR || — || align=right | 1.8 km || 
|-id=367 bgcolor=#E9E9E9
| 156367 ||  || — || December 14, 2001 || Palomar || NEAT || — || align=right | 1.8 km || 
|-id=368 bgcolor=#E9E9E9
| 156368 ||  || — || December 14, 2001 || Socorro || LINEAR || — || align=right | 2.9 km || 
|-id=369 bgcolor=#E9E9E9
| 156369 ||  || — || December 14, 2001 || Socorro || LINEAR || — || align=right | 3.5 km || 
|-id=370 bgcolor=#fefefe
| 156370 ||  || — || December 9, 2001 || Socorro || LINEAR || V || align=right | 1.3 km || 
|-id=371 bgcolor=#E9E9E9
| 156371 ||  || — || December 22, 2001 || Socorro || LINEAR || — || align=right | 6.7 km || 
|-id=372 bgcolor=#E9E9E9
| 156372 ||  || — || December 23, 2001 || Kingsnake || J. V. McClusky || EUN || align=right | 2.0 km || 
|-id=373 bgcolor=#fefefe
| 156373 ||  || — || December 17, 2001 || Socorro || LINEAR || NYS || align=right | 1.3 km || 
|-id=374 bgcolor=#E9E9E9
| 156374 ||  || — || December 17, 2001 || Socorro || LINEAR || — || align=right | 3.5 km || 
|-id=375 bgcolor=#E9E9E9
| 156375 ||  || — || December 18, 2001 || Socorro || LINEAR || — || align=right | 1.4 km || 
|-id=376 bgcolor=#E9E9E9
| 156376 ||  || — || December 18, 2001 || Socorro || LINEAR || — || align=right | 1.3 km || 
|-id=377 bgcolor=#E9E9E9
| 156377 ||  || — || December 18, 2001 || Socorro || LINEAR || KRM || align=right | 4.0 km || 
|-id=378 bgcolor=#E9E9E9
| 156378 ||  || — || December 18, 2001 || Socorro || LINEAR || — || align=right | 2.1 km || 
|-id=379 bgcolor=#E9E9E9
| 156379 ||  || — || December 18, 2001 || Socorro || LINEAR || — || align=right | 1.9 km || 
|-id=380 bgcolor=#E9E9E9
| 156380 ||  || — || December 18, 2001 || Socorro || LINEAR || — || align=right | 1.8 km || 
|-id=381 bgcolor=#E9E9E9
| 156381 ||  || — || December 18, 2001 || Socorro || LINEAR || — || align=right | 1.8 km || 
|-id=382 bgcolor=#E9E9E9
| 156382 ||  || — || December 18, 2001 || Socorro || LINEAR || EUN || align=right | 2.6 km || 
|-id=383 bgcolor=#E9E9E9
| 156383 ||  || — || December 18, 2001 || Socorro || LINEAR || — || align=right | 2.0 km || 
|-id=384 bgcolor=#E9E9E9
| 156384 ||  || — || December 18, 2001 || Socorro || LINEAR || — || align=right | 2.4 km || 
|-id=385 bgcolor=#E9E9E9
| 156385 ||  || — || December 18, 2001 || Socorro || LINEAR || ADE || align=right | 3.7 km || 
|-id=386 bgcolor=#E9E9E9
| 156386 ||  || — || December 18, 2001 || Socorro || LINEAR || ADE || align=right | 4.5 km || 
|-id=387 bgcolor=#E9E9E9
| 156387 ||  || — || December 17, 2001 || Socorro || LINEAR || — || align=right | 3.0 km || 
|-id=388 bgcolor=#E9E9E9
| 156388 ||  || — || December 17, 2001 || Socorro || LINEAR || — || align=right | 1.6 km || 
|-id=389 bgcolor=#E9E9E9
| 156389 ||  || — || December 17, 2001 || Socorro || LINEAR || — || align=right | 1.9 km || 
|-id=390 bgcolor=#E9E9E9
| 156390 ||  || — || December 17, 2001 || Socorro || LINEAR || MAR || align=right | 2.1 km || 
|-id=391 bgcolor=#E9E9E9
| 156391 ||  || — || December 17, 2001 || Socorro || LINEAR || — || align=right | 1.7 km || 
|-id=392 bgcolor=#E9E9E9
| 156392 ||  || — || December 18, 2001 || Palomar || NEAT || DOR || align=right | 4.1 km || 
|-id=393 bgcolor=#fefefe
| 156393 ||  || — || December 17, 2001 || Socorro || LINEAR || ERI || align=right | 3.7 km || 
|-id=394 bgcolor=#E9E9E9
| 156394 ||  || — || December 23, 2001 || Kitt Peak || Spacewatch || — || align=right | 4.0 km || 
|-id=395 bgcolor=#fefefe
| 156395 ||  || — || December 17, 2001 || Socorro || LINEAR || — || align=right | 1.3 km || 
|-id=396 bgcolor=#fefefe
| 156396 ||  || — || December 18, 2001 || Palomar || NEAT || NYS || align=right | 1.3 km || 
|-id=397 bgcolor=#E9E9E9
| 156397 ||  || — || December 18, 2001 || Anderson Mesa || LONEOS || EUN || align=right | 3.1 km || 
|-id=398 bgcolor=#E9E9E9
| 156398 ||  || — || December 19, 2001 || Anderson Mesa || LONEOS || EUN || align=right | 1.9 km || 
|-id=399 bgcolor=#E9E9E9
| 156399 ||  || — || December 20, 2001 || Palomar || NEAT || MAR || align=right | 1.9 km || 
|-id=400 bgcolor=#E9E9E9
| 156400 ||  || — || December 19, 2001 || Anderson Mesa || LONEOS || — || align=right | 2.8 km || 
|}

156401–156500 

|-bgcolor=#E9E9E9
| 156401 ||  || — || January 5, 2002 || Cima Ekar || ADAS || — || align=right | 2.6 km || 
|-id=402 bgcolor=#E9E9E9
| 156402 ||  || — || January 8, 2002 || Socorro || LINEAR || — || align=right | 4.5 km || 
|-id=403 bgcolor=#E9E9E9
| 156403 ||  || — || January 8, 2002 || Palomar || NEAT || RAF || align=right | 1.8 km || 
|-id=404 bgcolor=#E9E9E9
| 156404 ||  || — || January 8, 2002 || Palomar || NEAT || HNS || align=right | 2.8 km || 
|-id=405 bgcolor=#E9E9E9
| 156405 ||  || — || January 10, 2002 || Palomar || NEAT || — || align=right | 3.0 km || 
|-id=406 bgcolor=#E9E9E9
| 156406 ||  || — || January 9, 2002 || Socorro || LINEAR || — || align=right | 3.2 km || 
|-id=407 bgcolor=#E9E9E9
| 156407 ||  || — || January 9, 2002 || Socorro || LINEAR || MRX || align=right | 1.8 km || 
|-id=408 bgcolor=#E9E9E9
| 156408 ||  || — || January 9, 2002 || Socorro || LINEAR || — || align=right | 2.0 km || 
|-id=409 bgcolor=#E9E9E9
| 156409 ||  || — || January 9, 2002 || Socorro || LINEAR || — || align=right | 6.1 km || 
|-id=410 bgcolor=#E9E9E9
| 156410 ||  || — || January 9, 2002 || Socorro || LINEAR || — || align=right | 2.9 km || 
|-id=411 bgcolor=#E9E9E9
| 156411 ||  || — || January 9, 2002 || Socorro || LINEAR || — || align=right | 2.5 km || 
|-id=412 bgcolor=#E9E9E9
| 156412 ||  || — || January 9, 2002 || Socorro || LINEAR || — || align=right | 6.6 km || 
|-id=413 bgcolor=#E9E9E9
| 156413 ||  || — || January 11, 2002 || Socorro || LINEAR || — || align=right | 5.5 km || 
|-id=414 bgcolor=#E9E9E9
| 156414 ||  || — || January 8, 2002 || Kitt Peak || Spacewatch || — || align=right | 1.8 km || 
|-id=415 bgcolor=#E9E9E9
| 156415 ||  || — || January 8, 2002 || Socorro || LINEAR || — || align=right | 2.4 km || 
|-id=416 bgcolor=#E9E9E9
| 156416 ||  || — || January 8, 2002 || Socorro || LINEAR || — || align=right | 1.7 km || 
|-id=417 bgcolor=#E9E9E9
| 156417 ||  || — || January 8, 2002 || Socorro || LINEAR || — || align=right | 1.7 km || 
|-id=418 bgcolor=#E9E9E9
| 156418 ||  || — || January 9, 2002 || Socorro || LINEAR || — || align=right | 2.7 km || 
|-id=419 bgcolor=#fefefe
| 156419 ||  || — || January 9, 2002 || Socorro || LINEAR || — || align=right | 2.5 km || 
|-id=420 bgcolor=#E9E9E9
| 156420 ||  || — || January 9, 2002 || Socorro || LINEAR || HNS || align=right | 1.8 km || 
|-id=421 bgcolor=#E9E9E9
| 156421 ||  || — || January 9, 2002 || Socorro || LINEAR || — || align=right | 3.0 km || 
|-id=422 bgcolor=#E9E9E9
| 156422 ||  || — || January 9, 2002 || Socorro || LINEAR || — || align=right | 2.1 km || 
|-id=423 bgcolor=#d6d6d6
| 156423 ||  || — || January 12, 2002 || Cerro Tololo || DLS || BRA || align=right | 2.6 km || 
|-id=424 bgcolor=#E9E9E9
| 156424 ||  || — || January 8, 2002 || Socorro || LINEAR || — || align=right | 1.3 km || 
|-id=425 bgcolor=#E9E9E9
| 156425 ||  || — || January 8, 2002 || Socorro || LINEAR || — || align=right | 3.2 km || 
|-id=426 bgcolor=#E9E9E9
| 156426 ||  || — || January 8, 2002 || Socorro || LINEAR || — || align=right | 3.8 km || 
|-id=427 bgcolor=#E9E9E9
| 156427 ||  || — || January 8, 2002 || Socorro || LINEAR || — || align=right | 2.7 km || 
|-id=428 bgcolor=#E9E9E9
| 156428 ||  || — || January 8, 2002 || Socorro || LINEAR || — || align=right | 4.0 km || 
|-id=429 bgcolor=#E9E9E9
| 156429 ||  || — || January 8, 2002 || Socorro || LINEAR || XIZ || align=right | 2.2 km || 
|-id=430 bgcolor=#fefefe
| 156430 ||  || — || January 8, 2002 || Socorro || LINEAR || MAS || align=right | 1.6 km || 
|-id=431 bgcolor=#E9E9E9
| 156431 ||  || — || January 9, 2002 || Socorro || LINEAR || — || align=right | 2.7 km || 
|-id=432 bgcolor=#E9E9E9
| 156432 ||  || — || January 9, 2002 || Socorro || LINEAR || — || align=right | 2.4 km || 
|-id=433 bgcolor=#E9E9E9
| 156433 ||  || — || January 9, 2002 || Socorro || LINEAR || — || align=right | 2.6 km || 
|-id=434 bgcolor=#E9E9E9
| 156434 ||  || — || January 9, 2002 || Socorro || LINEAR || — || align=right | 3.3 km || 
|-id=435 bgcolor=#E9E9E9
| 156435 ||  || — || January 9, 2002 || Socorro || LINEAR || BRU || align=right | 7.7 km || 
|-id=436 bgcolor=#E9E9E9
| 156436 ||  || — || January 9, 2002 || Socorro || LINEAR || — || align=right | 2.6 km || 
|-id=437 bgcolor=#E9E9E9
| 156437 ||  || — || January 9, 2002 || Socorro || LINEAR || — || align=right | 3.0 km || 
|-id=438 bgcolor=#E9E9E9
| 156438 ||  || — || January 13, 2002 || Socorro || LINEAR || — || align=right | 2.2 km || 
|-id=439 bgcolor=#E9E9E9
| 156439 ||  || — || January 13, 2002 || Socorro || LINEAR || — || align=right | 1.5 km || 
|-id=440 bgcolor=#E9E9E9
| 156440 ||  || — || January 13, 2002 || Socorro || LINEAR || — || align=right | 3.1 km || 
|-id=441 bgcolor=#E9E9E9
| 156441 ||  || — || January 14, 2002 || Socorro || LINEAR || — || align=right | 1.6 km || 
|-id=442 bgcolor=#E9E9E9
| 156442 ||  || — || January 13, 2002 || Socorro || LINEAR || — || align=right | 3.9 km || 
|-id=443 bgcolor=#E9E9E9
| 156443 ||  || — || January 13, 2002 || Socorro || LINEAR || — || align=right | 2.4 km || 
|-id=444 bgcolor=#E9E9E9
| 156444 ||  || — || January 13, 2002 || Socorro || LINEAR || INO || align=right | 2.0 km || 
|-id=445 bgcolor=#E9E9E9
| 156445 ||  || — || January 13, 2002 || Socorro || LINEAR || — || align=right | 2.8 km || 
|-id=446 bgcolor=#E9E9E9
| 156446 ||  || — || January 13, 2002 || Socorro || LINEAR || — || align=right | 1.7 km || 
|-id=447 bgcolor=#E9E9E9
| 156447 ||  || — || January 14, 2002 || Socorro || LINEAR || — || align=right | 2.4 km || 
|-id=448 bgcolor=#E9E9E9
| 156448 ||  || — || January 5, 2002 || Palomar || NEAT || JUN || align=right | 1.7 km || 
|-id=449 bgcolor=#fefefe
| 156449 ||  || — || January 5, 2002 || Palomar || NEAT || — || align=right | 1.8 km || 
|-id=450 bgcolor=#fefefe
| 156450 ||  || — || January 12, 2002 || Socorro || LINEAR || NYS || align=right | 1.1 km || 
|-id=451 bgcolor=#E9E9E9
| 156451 ||  || — || January 5, 2002 || Kitt Peak || Spacewatch || — || align=right | 2.2 km || 
|-id=452 bgcolor=#E9E9E9
| 156452 ||  || — || January 18, 2002 || Anderson Mesa || LONEOS || — || align=right | 4.3 km || 
|-id=453 bgcolor=#E9E9E9
| 156453 ||  || — || January 18, 2002 || Socorro || LINEAR || XIZ || align=right | 2.3 km || 
|-id=454 bgcolor=#E9E9E9
| 156454 ||  || — || January 18, 2002 || Socorro || LINEAR || — || align=right | 2.5 km || 
|-id=455 bgcolor=#E9E9E9
| 156455 ||  || — || January 19, 2002 || Socorro || LINEAR || — || align=right | 2.9 km || 
|-id=456 bgcolor=#E9E9E9
| 156456 ||  || — || January 19, 2002 || Socorro || LINEAR || — || align=right | 2.4 km || 
|-id=457 bgcolor=#E9E9E9
| 156457 ||  || — || January 23, 2002 || Socorro || LINEAR || — || align=right | 2.6 km || 
|-id=458 bgcolor=#E9E9E9
| 156458 ||  || — || January 20, 2002 || Anderson Mesa || LONEOS || — || align=right | 2.0 km || 
|-id=459 bgcolor=#fefefe
| 156459 ||  || — || January 20, 2002 || Anderson Mesa || LONEOS || — || align=right | 4.2 km || 
|-id=460 bgcolor=#E9E9E9
| 156460 ||  || — || January 20, 2002 || Anderson Mesa || LONEOS || — || align=right | 2.1 km || 
|-id=461 bgcolor=#E9E9E9
| 156461 ||  || — || January 20, 2002 || Anderson Mesa || LONEOS || — || align=right | 4.5 km || 
|-id=462 bgcolor=#E9E9E9
| 156462 ||  || — || January 19, 2002 || Anderson Mesa || LONEOS || EUN || align=right | 2.0 km || 
|-id=463 bgcolor=#E9E9E9
| 156463 ||  || — || February 3, 2002 || Palomar || NEAT || — || align=right | 2.5 km || 
|-id=464 bgcolor=#E9E9E9
| 156464 ||  || — || February 4, 2002 || Palomar || NEAT || — || align=right | 2.0 km || 
|-id=465 bgcolor=#E9E9E9
| 156465 ||  || — || February 4, 2002 || Palomar || NEAT || — || align=right | 2.2 km || 
|-id=466 bgcolor=#FA8072
| 156466 ||  || — || February 6, 2002 || Socorro || LINEAR || H || align=right data-sort-value="0.64" | 640 m || 
|-id=467 bgcolor=#E9E9E9
| 156467 ||  || — || February 5, 2002 || Palomar || NEAT || — || align=right | 2.4 km || 
|-id=468 bgcolor=#E9E9E9
| 156468 ||  || — || February 6, 2002 || Socorro || LINEAR || ADE || align=right | 4.4 km || 
|-id=469 bgcolor=#E9E9E9
| 156469 ||  || — || February 6, 2002 || Socorro || LINEAR || — || align=right | 4.4 km || 
|-id=470 bgcolor=#E9E9E9
| 156470 ||  || — || February 7, 2002 || Socorro || LINEAR || — || align=right | 3.6 km || 
|-id=471 bgcolor=#E9E9E9
| 156471 ||  || — || February 6, 2002 || Haleakala || NEAT || — || align=right | 2.2 km || 
|-id=472 bgcolor=#E9E9E9
| 156472 ||  || — || February 8, 2002 || Kitt Peak || Spacewatch || — || align=right | 3.1 km || 
|-id=473 bgcolor=#E9E9E9
| 156473 ||  || — || February 6, 2002 || Goodricke-Pigott || R. A. Tucker || — || align=right | 4.0 km || 
|-id=474 bgcolor=#E9E9E9
| 156474 ||  || — || February 11, 2002 || Gnosca || S. Sposetti || — || align=right | 2.8 km || 
|-id=475 bgcolor=#E9E9E9
| 156475 ||  || — || February 3, 2002 || Haleakala || NEAT || — || align=right | 3.0 km || 
|-id=476 bgcolor=#E9E9E9
| 156476 ||  || — || February 3, 2002 || Palomar || NEAT || — || align=right | 2.0 km || 
|-id=477 bgcolor=#d6d6d6
| 156477 ||  || — || February 12, 2002 || Desert Eagle || W. K. Y. Yeung || 628 || align=right | 3.3 km || 
|-id=478 bgcolor=#E9E9E9
| 156478 ||  || — || February 7, 2002 || Socorro || LINEAR || — || align=right | 4.0 km || 
|-id=479 bgcolor=#E9E9E9
| 156479 ||  || — || February 6, 2002 || Socorro || LINEAR || — || align=right | 3.7 km || 
|-id=480 bgcolor=#E9E9E9
| 156480 ||  || — || February 6, 2002 || Socorro || LINEAR || — || align=right | 3.4 km || 
|-id=481 bgcolor=#E9E9E9
| 156481 ||  || — || February 6, 2002 || Socorro || LINEAR || — || align=right | 3.0 km || 
|-id=482 bgcolor=#E9E9E9
| 156482 ||  || — || February 6, 2002 || Socorro || LINEAR || HNS || align=right | 2.5 km || 
|-id=483 bgcolor=#E9E9E9
| 156483 ||  || — || February 6, 2002 || Socorro || LINEAR || — || align=right | 3.7 km || 
|-id=484 bgcolor=#E9E9E9
| 156484 ||  || — || February 6, 2002 || Socorro || LINEAR || — || align=right | 3.6 km || 
|-id=485 bgcolor=#E9E9E9
| 156485 ||  || — || February 7, 2002 || Socorro || LINEAR || — || align=right | 2.1 km || 
|-id=486 bgcolor=#E9E9E9
| 156486 ||  || — || February 7, 2002 || Socorro || LINEAR || — || align=right | 4.6 km || 
|-id=487 bgcolor=#E9E9E9
| 156487 ||  || — || February 7, 2002 || Socorro || LINEAR || — || align=right | 2.4 km || 
|-id=488 bgcolor=#E9E9E9
| 156488 ||  || — || February 7, 2002 || Socorro || LINEAR || — || align=right | 2.5 km || 
|-id=489 bgcolor=#E9E9E9
| 156489 ||  || — || February 7, 2002 || Socorro || LINEAR || — || align=right | 2.9 km || 
|-id=490 bgcolor=#E9E9E9
| 156490 ||  || — || February 7, 2002 || Socorro || LINEAR || NEM || align=right | 3.9 km || 
|-id=491 bgcolor=#E9E9E9
| 156491 ||  || — || February 7, 2002 || Socorro || LINEAR || — || align=right | 3.9 km || 
|-id=492 bgcolor=#E9E9E9
| 156492 ||  || — || February 7, 2002 || Socorro || LINEAR || DOR || align=right | 5.5 km || 
|-id=493 bgcolor=#E9E9E9
| 156493 ||  || — || February 7, 2002 || Socorro || LINEAR || — || align=right | 4.2 km || 
|-id=494 bgcolor=#E9E9E9
| 156494 ||  || — || February 7, 2002 || Socorro || LINEAR || — || align=right | 3.3 km || 
|-id=495 bgcolor=#E9E9E9
| 156495 ||  || — || February 7, 2002 || Socorro || LINEAR || — || align=right | 3.2 km || 
|-id=496 bgcolor=#E9E9E9
| 156496 ||  || — || February 7, 2002 || Socorro || LINEAR || — || align=right | 2.1 km || 
|-id=497 bgcolor=#E9E9E9
| 156497 ||  || — || February 7, 2002 || Socorro || LINEAR || — || align=right | 2.5 km || 
|-id=498 bgcolor=#E9E9E9
| 156498 ||  || — || February 7, 2002 || Socorro || LINEAR || — || align=right | 3.8 km || 
|-id=499 bgcolor=#E9E9E9
| 156499 ||  || — || February 8, 2002 || Socorro || LINEAR || MRX || align=right | 1.7 km || 
|-id=500 bgcolor=#E9E9E9
| 156500 ||  || — || February 9, 2002 || Socorro || LINEAR || — || align=right | 2.6 km || 
|}

156501–156600 

|-bgcolor=#E9E9E9
| 156501 ||  || — || February 9, 2002 || Socorro || LINEAR || — || align=right | 2.9 km || 
|-id=502 bgcolor=#d6d6d6
| 156502 ||  || — || February 9, 2002 || Socorro || LINEAR || EOS || align=right | 2.7 km || 
|-id=503 bgcolor=#E9E9E9
| 156503 ||  || — || February 10, 2002 || Socorro || LINEAR || — || align=right | 3.0 km || 
|-id=504 bgcolor=#E9E9E9
| 156504 ||  || — || February 8, 2002 || Socorro || LINEAR || — || align=right | 1.8 km || 
|-id=505 bgcolor=#E9E9E9
| 156505 ||  || — || February 8, 2002 || Socorro || LINEAR || — || align=right | 3.8 km || 
|-id=506 bgcolor=#E9E9E9
| 156506 ||  || — || February 8, 2002 || Socorro || LINEAR || — || align=right | 2.8 km || 
|-id=507 bgcolor=#E9E9E9
| 156507 ||  || — || February 8, 2002 || Socorro || LINEAR || — || align=right | 2.5 km || 
|-id=508 bgcolor=#E9E9E9
| 156508 ||  || — || February 8, 2002 || Socorro || LINEAR || — || align=right | 3.3 km || 
|-id=509 bgcolor=#E9E9E9
| 156509 ||  || — || February 8, 2002 || Socorro || LINEAR || — || align=right | 4.7 km || 
|-id=510 bgcolor=#E9E9E9
| 156510 ||  || — || February 8, 2002 || Socorro || LINEAR || — || align=right | 4.8 km || 
|-id=511 bgcolor=#E9E9E9
| 156511 ||  || — || February 10, 2002 || Socorro || LINEAR || HEN || align=right | 1.6 km || 
|-id=512 bgcolor=#E9E9E9
| 156512 ||  || — || February 10, 2002 || Socorro || LINEAR || — || align=right | 1.9 km || 
|-id=513 bgcolor=#E9E9E9
| 156513 ||  || — || February 10, 2002 || Socorro || LINEAR || — || align=right | 2.3 km || 
|-id=514 bgcolor=#E9E9E9
| 156514 ||  || — || February 10, 2002 || Socorro || LINEAR || — || align=right | 3.1 km || 
|-id=515 bgcolor=#E9E9E9
| 156515 ||  || — || February 10, 2002 || Socorro || LINEAR || HEN || align=right | 1.7 km || 
|-id=516 bgcolor=#E9E9E9
| 156516 ||  || — || February 10, 2002 || Socorro || LINEAR || HEN || align=right | 1.7 km || 
|-id=517 bgcolor=#E9E9E9
| 156517 ||  || — || February 10, 2002 || Socorro || LINEAR || — || align=right | 2.9 km || 
|-id=518 bgcolor=#E9E9E9
| 156518 ||  || — || February 10, 2002 || Socorro || LINEAR || GEF || align=right | 2.3 km || 
|-id=519 bgcolor=#E9E9E9
| 156519 ||  || — || February 10, 2002 || Socorro || LINEAR || — || align=right | 4.0 km || 
|-id=520 bgcolor=#d6d6d6
| 156520 ||  || — || February 10, 2002 || Socorro || LINEAR || — || align=right | 5.5 km || 
|-id=521 bgcolor=#E9E9E9
| 156521 ||  || — || February 6, 2002 || Palomar || NEAT || — || align=right | 3.8 km || 
|-id=522 bgcolor=#E9E9E9
| 156522 ||  || — || February 12, 2002 || Kitt Peak || Spacewatch || — || align=right | 3.8 km || 
|-id=523 bgcolor=#E9E9E9
| 156523 ||  || — || February 15, 2002 || Socorro || LINEAR || XIZ || align=right | 2.2 km || 
|-id=524 bgcolor=#E9E9E9
| 156524 ||  || — || February 4, 2002 || Anderson Mesa || LONEOS || — || align=right | 4.1 km || 
|-id=525 bgcolor=#E9E9E9
| 156525 ||  || — || February 4, 2002 || Palomar || NEAT || — || align=right | 2.7 km || 
|-id=526 bgcolor=#E9E9E9
| 156526 ||  || — || February 6, 2002 || Anderson Mesa || LONEOS || EUN || align=right | 2.1 km || 
|-id=527 bgcolor=#E9E9E9
| 156527 ||  || — || February 4, 2002 || Palomar || NEAT || NEM || align=right | 3.3 km || 
|-id=528 bgcolor=#E9E9E9
| 156528 ||  || — || February 6, 2002 || Palomar || NEAT || AER || align=right | 2.4 km || 
|-id=529 bgcolor=#E9E9E9
| 156529 ||  || — || February 6, 2002 || Kitt Peak || Spacewatch || DOR || align=right | 3.4 km || 
|-id=530 bgcolor=#E9E9E9
| 156530 ||  || — || February 7, 2002 || Palomar || NEAT || — || align=right | 3.4 km || 
|-id=531 bgcolor=#E9E9E9
| 156531 ||  || — || February 7, 2002 || Anderson Mesa || LONEOS || ADE || align=right | 5.2 km || 
|-id=532 bgcolor=#E9E9E9
| 156532 ||  || — || February 7, 2002 || Palomar || NEAT || NEM || align=right | 3.3 km || 
|-id=533 bgcolor=#E9E9E9
| 156533 ||  || — || February 7, 2002 || Kitt Peak || Spacewatch || HEN || align=right | 1.7 km || 
|-id=534 bgcolor=#d6d6d6
| 156534 ||  || — || February 8, 2002 || Kitt Peak || Spacewatch || KOR || align=right | 2.4 km || 
|-id=535 bgcolor=#E9E9E9
| 156535 ||  || — || February 10, 2002 || Socorro || LINEAR || MAR || align=right | 1.9 km || 
|-id=536 bgcolor=#E9E9E9
| 156536 ||  || — || February 11, 2002 || Socorro || LINEAR || NEM || align=right | 3.7 km || 
|-id=537 bgcolor=#E9E9E9
| 156537 ||  || — || February 11, 2002 || Socorro || LINEAR || — || align=right | 3.5 km || 
|-id=538 bgcolor=#E9E9E9
| 156538 ||  || — || February 11, 2002 || Socorro || LINEAR || WIT || align=right | 1.7 km || 
|-id=539 bgcolor=#E9E9E9
| 156539 ||  || — || February 11, 2002 || Socorro || LINEAR || PAD || align=right | 4.1 km || 
|-id=540 bgcolor=#E9E9E9
| 156540 ||  || — || February 6, 2002 || Palomar || NEAT || — || align=right | 2.6 km || 
|-id=541 bgcolor=#E9E9E9
| 156541 ||  || — || February 10, 2002 || Socorro || LINEAR || GEF || align=right | 1.9 km || 
|-id=542 bgcolor=#d6d6d6
| 156542 Hogg ||  ||  || February 13, 2002 || Apache Point || SDSS || KOR || align=right | 1.7 km || 
|-id=543 bgcolor=#E9E9E9
| 156543 ||  || — || February 19, 2002 || Socorro || LINEAR || — || align=right | 3.6 km || 
|-id=544 bgcolor=#E9E9E9
| 156544 ||  || — || February 19, 2002 || Socorro || LINEAR || EUN || align=right | 2.5 km || 
|-id=545 bgcolor=#E9E9E9
| 156545 ||  || — || February 20, 2002 || Socorro || LINEAR || — || align=right | 2.7 km || 
|-id=546 bgcolor=#E9E9E9
| 156546 ||  || — || February 16, 2002 || Palomar || NEAT || — || align=right | 2.9 km || 
|-id=547 bgcolor=#E9E9E9
| 156547 ||  || — || February 16, 2002 || Palomar || NEAT || — || align=right | 2.8 km || 
|-id=548 bgcolor=#E9E9E9
| 156548 ||  || — || March 6, 2002 || Ondřejov || P. Kušnirák || — || align=right | 3.3 km || 
|-id=549 bgcolor=#E9E9E9
| 156549 ||  || — || March 10, 2002 || Cima Ekar || ADAS || — || align=right | 3.1 km || 
|-id=550 bgcolor=#E9E9E9
| 156550 ||  || — || March 12, 2002 || Bohyunsan || Bohyunsan Obs. || — || align=right | 1.9 km || 
|-id=551 bgcolor=#d6d6d6
| 156551 ||  || — || March 9, 2002 || Socorro || LINEAR || CHA || align=right | 4.3 km || 
|-id=552 bgcolor=#E9E9E9
| 156552 ||  || — || March 9, 2002 || Socorro || LINEAR || — || align=right | 3.3 km || 
|-id=553 bgcolor=#d6d6d6
| 156553 ||  || — || March 9, 2002 || Socorro || LINEAR || KOR || align=right | 2.9 km || 
|-id=554 bgcolor=#E9E9E9
| 156554 ||  || — || March 9, 2002 || Socorro || LINEAR || — || align=right | 4.1 km || 
|-id=555 bgcolor=#E9E9E9
| 156555 ||  || — || March 12, 2002 || Palomar || NEAT || — || align=right | 3.0 km || 
|-id=556 bgcolor=#E9E9E9
| 156556 ||  || — || March 12, 2002 || Palomar || NEAT || — || align=right | 3.9 km || 
|-id=557 bgcolor=#d6d6d6
| 156557 ||  || — || March 12, 2002 || Palomar || NEAT || — || align=right | 3.9 km || 
|-id=558 bgcolor=#d6d6d6
| 156558 ||  || — || March 12, 2002 || Palomar || NEAT || — || align=right | 3.9 km || 
|-id=559 bgcolor=#E9E9E9
| 156559 ||  || — || March 9, 2002 || Socorro || LINEAR || PAD || align=right | 4.4 km || 
|-id=560 bgcolor=#E9E9E9
| 156560 ||  || — || March 13, 2002 || Socorro || LINEAR || — || align=right | 4.2 km || 
|-id=561 bgcolor=#d6d6d6
| 156561 ||  || — || March 13, 2002 || Socorro || LINEAR || KAR || align=right | 2.0 km || 
|-id=562 bgcolor=#E9E9E9
| 156562 ||  || — || March 13, 2002 || Socorro || LINEAR || — || align=right | 3.9 km || 
|-id=563 bgcolor=#E9E9E9
| 156563 ||  || — || March 11, 2002 || Kitt Peak || Spacewatch || — || align=right | 2.0 km || 
|-id=564 bgcolor=#d6d6d6
| 156564 ||  || — || March 13, 2002 || Palomar || NEAT || — || align=right | 4.4 km || 
|-id=565 bgcolor=#E9E9E9
| 156565 ||  || — || March 9, 2002 || Socorro || LINEAR || HNA || align=right | 4.0 km || 
|-id=566 bgcolor=#E9E9E9
| 156566 ||  || — || March 9, 2002 || Socorro || LINEAR || — || align=right | 4.2 km || 
|-id=567 bgcolor=#d6d6d6
| 156567 ||  || — || March 9, 2002 || Socorro || LINEAR || — || align=right | 4.9 km || 
|-id=568 bgcolor=#E9E9E9
| 156568 ||  || — || March 12, 2002 || Socorro || LINEAR || — || align=right | 4.1 km || 
|-id=569 bgcolor=#E9E9E9
| 156569 ||  || — || March 6, 2002 || Socorro || LINEAR || — || align=right | 4.5 km || 
|-id=570 bgcolor=#E9E9E9
| 156570 ||  || — || March 6, 2002 || Socorro || LINEAR || — || align=right | 4.7 km || 
|-id=571 bgcolor=#E9E9E9
| 156571 ||  || — || March 9, 2002 || Anderson Mesa || LONEOS || — || align=right | 2.6 km || 
|-id=572 bgcolor=#E9E9E9
| 156572 ||  || — || March 13, 2002 || Socorro || LINEAR || PAD || align=right | 3.6 km || 
|-id=573 bgcolor=#d6d6d6
| 156573 ||  || — || March 13, 2002 || Kitt Peak || Spacewatch || KOR || align=right | 2.2 km || 
|-id=574 bgcolor=#d6d6d6
| 156574 ||  || — || March 13, 2002 || Socorro || LINEAR || — || align=right | 4.1 km || 
|-id=575 bgcolor=#d6d6d6
| 156575 ||  || — || March 12, 2002 || Palomar || NEAT || — || align=right | 4.7 km || 
|-id=576 bgcolor=#E9E9E9
| 156576 ||  || — || March 12, 2002 || Kitt Peak || Spacewatch || HEN || align=right | 1.7 km || 
|-id=577 bgcolor=#E9E9E9
| 156577 ||  || — || March 12, 2002 || Kitt Peak || Spacewatch || PAD || align=right | 3.4 km || 
|-id=578 bgcolor=#d6d6d6
| 156578 ||  || — || March 15, 2002 || Palomar || NEAT || — || align=right | 3.7 km || 
|-id=579 bgcolor=#E9E9E9
| 156579 ||  || — || March 15, 2002 || Palomar || NEAT || HEN || align=right | 2.3 km || 
|-id=580 bgcolor=#E9E9E9
| 156580 Madách ||  ||  || March 3, 2002 || Piszkéstető || K. Sárneczky || — || align=right | 2.6 km || 
|-id=581 bgcolor=#FA8072
| 156581 || 2002 FO || — || March 16, 2002 || Socorro || LINEAR || H || align=right data-sort-value="0.93" | 930 m || 
|-id=582 bgcolor=#E9E9E9
| 156582 ||  || — || March 18, 2002 || Haleakala || NEAT || — || align=right | 4.1 km || 
|-id=583 bgcolor=#d6d6d6
| 156583 ||  || — || March 19, 2002 || Anderson Mesa || LONEOS || KOR || align=right | 2.3 km || 
|-id=584 bgcolor=#d6d6d6
| 156584 ||  || — || March 20, 2002 || Socorro || LINEAR || THM || align=right | 4.1 km || 
|-id=585 bgcolor=#E9E9E9
| 156585 ||  || — || April 3, 2002 || Kitt Peak || Spacewatch || HOF || align=right | 4.8 km || 
|-id=586 bgcolor=#d6d6d6
| 156586 ||  || — || April 4, 2002 || Palomar || NEAT || EOS || align=right | 2.9 km || 
|-id=587 bgcolor=#E9E9E9
| 156587 ||  || — || April 4, 2002 || Palomar || NEAT || — || align=right | 4.6 km || 
|-id=588 bgcolor=#d6d6d6
| 156588 ||  || — || April 4, 2002 || Palomar || NEAT || — || align=right | 3.7 km || 
|-id=589 bgcolor=#d6d6d6
| 156589 ||  || — || April 5, 2002 || Palomar || NEAT || — || align=right | 4.1 km || 
|-id=590 bgcolor=#d6d6d6
| 156590 ||  || — || April 5, 2002 || Palomar || NEAT || — || align=right | 3.7 km || 
|-id=591 bgcolor=#d6d6d6
| 156591 ||  || — || April 5, 2002 || Palomar || NEAT || KOR || align=right | 2.8 km || 
|-id=592 bgcolor=#d6d6d6
| 156592 ||  || — || April 8, 2002 || Kitt Peak || Spacewatch || THM || align=right | 3.0 km || 
|-id=593 bgcolor=#d6d6d6
| 156593 ||  || — || April 8, 2002 || Palomar || NEAT || — || align=right | 4.5 km || 
|-id=594 bgcolor=#E9E9E9
| 156594 ||  || — || April 8, 2002 || Palomar || NEAT || GEF || align=right | 3.1 km || 
|-id=595 bgcolor=#d6d6d6
| 156595 ||  || — || April 8, 2002 || Socorro || LINEAR || — || align=right | 5.2 km || 
|-id=596 bgcolor=#d6d6d6
| 156596 ||  || — || April 8, 2002 || Kitt Peak || Spacewatch || LIX || align=right | 7.1 km || 
|-id=597 bgcolor=#d6d6d6
| 156597 ||  || — || April 9, 2002 || Anderson Mesa || LONEOS || KOR || align=right | 2.8 km || 
|-id=598 bgcolor=#d6d6d6
| 156598 ||  || — || April 9, 2002 || Socorro || LINEAR || — || align=right | 3.8 km || 
|-id=599 bgcolor=#d6d6d6
| 156599 ||  || — || April 9, 2002 || Anderson Mesa || LONEOS || — || align=right | 6.0 km || 
|-id=600 bgcolor=#d6d6d6
| 156600 ||  || — || April 9, 2002 || Socorro || LINEAR || BRA || align=right | 3.2 km || 
|}

156601–156700 

|-bgcolor=#d6d6d6
| 156601 ||  || — || April 9, 2002 || Kvistaberg || UDAS || — || align=right | 6.2 km || 
|-id=602 bgcolor=#d6d6d6
| 156602 ||  || — || April 10, 2002 || Socorro || LINEAR || EOS || align=right | 3.4 km || 
|-id=603 bgcolor=#d6d6d6
| 156603 ||  || — || April 10, 2002 || Socorro || LINEAR || — || align=right | 4.8 km || 
|-id=604 bgcolor=#d6d6d6
| 156604 ||  || — || April 10, 2002 || Socorro || LINEAR || — || align=right | 5.4 km || 
|-id=605 bgcolor=#d6d6d6
| 156605 ||  || — || April 10, 2002 || Socorro || LINEAR || — || align=right | 5.6 km || 
|-id=606 bgcolor=#d6d6d6
| 156606 ||  || — || April 10, 2002 || Socorro || LINEAR || EOS || align=right | 3.4 km || 
|-id=607 bgcolor=#d6d6d6
| 156607 ||  || — || April 8, 2002 || Bergisch Gladbach || W. Bickel || — || align=right | 4.9 km || 
|-id=608 bgcolor=#d6d6d6
| 156608 ||  || — || April 10, 2002 || Socorro || LINEAR || TEL || align=right | 2.7 km || 
|-id=609 bgcolor=#d6d6d6
| 156609 ||  || — || April 11, 2002 || Anderson Mesa || LONEOS || — || align=right | 4.8 km || 
|-id=610 bgcolor=#d6d6d6
| 156610 ||  || — || April 11, 2002 || Socorro || LINEAR || YAK || align=right | 6.5 km || 
|-id=611 bgcolor=#d6d6d6
| 156611 ||  || — || April 12, 2002 || Socorro || LINEAR || — || align=right | 4.3 km || 
|-id=612 bgcolor=#E9E9E9
| 156612 ||  || — || April 12, 2002 || Socorro || LINEAR || — || align=right | 3.9 km || 
|-id=613 bgcolor=#d6d6d6
| 156613 ||  || — || April 12, 2002 || Socorro || LINEAR || KOR || align=right | 2.0 km || 
|-id=614 bgcolor=#d6d6d6
| 156614 ||  || — || April 12, 2002 || Socorro || LINEAR || — || align=right | 4.5 km || 
|-id=615 bgcolor=#d6d6d6
| 156615 ||  || — || April 12, 2002 || Socorro || LINEAR || — || align=right | 3.3 km || 
|-id=616 bgcolor=#d6d6d6
| 156616 ||  || — || April 12, 2002 || Socorro || LINEAR || — || align=right | 4.5 km || 
|-id=617 bgcolor=#d6d6d6
| 156617 ||  || — || April 12, 2002 || Palomar || NEAT || — || align=right | 3.8 km || 
|-id=618 bgcolor=#d6d6d6
| 156618 ||  || — || April 13, 2002 || Palomar || NEAT || — || align=right | 4.7 km || 
|-id=619 bgcolor=#d6d6d6
| 156619 ||  || — || April 11, 2002 || Palomar || NEAT || BRA || align=right | 3.1 km || 
|-id=620 bgcolor=#d6d6d6
| 156620 ||  || — || April 12, 2002 || Palomar || NEAT || — || align=right | 5.6 km || 
|-id=621 bgcolor=#E9E9E9
| 156621 ||  || — || April 13, 2002 || Palomar || NEAT || — || align=right | 2.8 km || 
|-id=622 bgcolor=#d6d6d6
| 156622 ||  || — || April 14, 2002 || Socorro || LINEAR || — || align=right | 4.9 km || 
|-id=623 bgcolor=#E9E9E9
| 156623 ||  || — || April 12, 2002 || Palomar || NEAT || — || align=right | 4.0 km || 
|-id=624 bgcolor=#d6d6d6
| 156624 ||  || — || April 13, 2002 || Palomar || NEAT || — || align=right | 4.9 km || 
|-id=625 bgcolor=#E9E9E9
| 156625 ||  || — || April 14, 2002 || Palomar || NEAT || AGN || align=right | 2.4 km || 
|-id=626 bgcolor=#d6d6d6
| 156626 ||  || — || April 9, 2002 || Socorro || LINEAR || BRA || align=right | 3.5 km || 
|-id=627 bgcolor=#E9E9E9
| 156627 ||  || — || April 11, 2002 || Socorro || LINEAR || MRX || align=right | 2.5 km || 
|-id=628 bgcolor=#d6d6d6
| 156628 ||  || — || April 8, 2002 || Palomar || NEAT || — || align=right | 3.7 km || 
|-id=629 bgcolor=#FA8072
| 156629 || 2002 HC || — || April 16, 2002 || Socorro || LINEAR || H || align=right data-sort-value="0.98" | 980 m || 
|-id=630 bgcolor=#d6d6d6
| 156630 ||  || — || April 16, 2002 || Socorro || LINEAR || — || align=right | 4.9 km || 
|-id=631 bgcolor=#d6d6d6
| 156631 Margitan ||  ||  || May 6, 2002 || Palomar || NEAT || TIR || align=right | 5.8 km || 
|-id=632 bgcolor=#d6d6d6
| 156632 ||  || — || May 2, 2002 || Anderson Mesa || LONEOS || — || align=right | 6.4 km || 
|-id=633 bgcolor=#d6d6d6
| 156633 ||  || — || May 6, 2002 || Anderson Mesa || LONEOS || — || align=right | 6.1 km || 
|-id=634 bgcolor=#fefefe
| 156634 ||  || — || May 8, 2002 || Socorro || LINEAR || H || align=right | 1.2 km || 
|-id=635 bgcolor=#d6d6d6
| 156635 ||  || — || May 6, 2002 || Palomar || NEAT || — || align=right | 6.4 km || 
|-id=636 bgcolor=#d6d6d6
| 156636 ||  || — || May 9, 2002 || Desert Eagle || W. K. Y. Yeung || — || align=right | 6.4 km || 
|-id=637 bgcolor=#d6d6d6
| 156637 ||  || — || May 8, 2002 || Socorro || LINEAR || EOS || align=right | 3.8 km || 
|-id=638 bgcolor=#d6d6d6
| 156638 ||  || — || May 8, 2002 || Socorro || LINEAR || — || align=right | 5.7 km || 
|-id=639 bgcolor=#d6d6d6
| 156639 ||  || — || May 8, 2002 || Socorro || LINEAR || — || align=right | 4.2 km || 
|-id=640 bgcolor=#d6d6d6
| 156640 ||  || — || May 9, 2002 || Socorro || LINEAR || — || align=right | 5.8 km || 
|-id=641 bgcolor=#d6d6d6
| 156641 ||  || — || May 9, 2002 || Socorro || LINEAR || EOS || align=right | 3.6 km || 
|-id=642 bgcolor=#d6d6d6
| 156642 ||  || — || May 9, 2002 || Socorro || LINEAR || — || align=right | 6.9 km || 
|-id=643 bgcolor=#d6d6d6
| 156643 ||  || — || May 9, 2002 || Socorro || LINEAR || — || align=right | 6.3 km || 
|-id=644 bgcolor=#d6d6d6
| 156644 ||  || — || May 9, 2002 || Socorro || LINEAR || — || align=right | 6.0 km || 
|-id=645 bgcolor=#d6d6d6
| 156645 ||  || — || May 9, 2002 || Socorro || LINEAR || — || align=right | 6.0 km || 
|-id=646 bgcolor=#d6d6d6
| 156646 ||  || — || May 9, 2002 || Socorro || LINEAR || — || align=right | 6.7 km || 
|-id=647 bgcolor=#d6d6d6
| 156647 ||  || — || May 9, 2002 || Socorro || LINEAR || — || align=right | 4.4 km || 
|-id=648 bgcolor=#d6d6d6
| 156648 ||  || — || May 9, 2002 || Socorro || LINEAR || EOS || align=right | 3.0 km || 
|-id=649 bgcolor=#d6d6d6
| 156649 ||  || — || May 9, 2002 || Socorro || LINEAR || — || align=right | 5.7 km || 
|-id=650 bgcolor=#d6d6d6
| 156650 ||  || — || May 9, 2002 || Socorro || LINEAR || — || align=right | 6.2 km || 
|-id=651 bgcolor=#d6d6d6
| 156651 ||  || — || May 9, 2002 || Socorro || LINEAR || TIR || align=right | 5.2 km || 
|-id=652 bgcolor=#d6d6d6
| 156652 ||  || — || May 9, 2002 || Socorro || LINEAR || — || align=right | 5.5 km || 
|-id=653 bgcolor=#d6d6d6
| 156653 ||  || — || May 9, 2002 || Socorro || LINEAR || — || align=right | 4.7 km || 
|-id=654 bgcolor=#d6d6d6
| 156654 ||  || — || May 9, 2002 || Socorro || LINEAR || — || align=right | 4.0 km || 
|-id=655 bgcolor=#fefefe
| 156655 ||  || — || May 9, 2002 || Socorro || LINEAR || H || align=right data-sort-value="0.88" | 880 m || 
|-id=656 bgcolor=#E9E9E9
| 156656 ||  || — || May 7, 2002 || Socorro || LINEAR || — || align=right | 4.7 km || 
|-id=657 bgcolor=#d6d6d6
| 156657 ||  || — || May 7, 2002 || Socorro || LINEAR || — || align=right | 5.9 km || 
|-id=658 bgcolor=#d6d6d6
| 156658 ||  || — || May 8, 2002 || Socorro || LINEAR || — || align=right | 6.3 km || 
|-id=659 bgcolor=#d6d6d6
| 156659 ||  || — || May 11, 2002 || Socorro || LINEAR || — || align=right | 3.4 km || 
|-id=660 bgcolor=#d6d6d6
| 156660 ||  || — || May 11, 2002 || Socorro || LINEAR || — || align=right | 4.8 km || 
|-id=661 bgcolor=#d6d6d6
| 156661 ||  || — || May 11, 2002 || Socorro || LINEAR || EOS || align=right | 2.7 km || 
|-id=662 bgcolor=#d6d6d6
| 156662 ||  || — || May 11, 2002 || Socorro || LINEAR || KOR || align=right | 2.6 km || 
|-id=663 bgcolor=#d6d6d6
| 156663 ||  || — || May 11, 2002 || Socorro || LINEAR || — || align=right | 4.1 km || 
|-id=664 bgcolor=#d6d6d6
| 156664 ||  || — || May 13, 2002 || Socorro || LINEAR || — || align=right | 3.4 km || 
|-id=665 bgcolor=#d6d6d6
| 156665 ||  || — || May 9, 2002 || Socorro || LINEAR || — || align=right | 4.1 km || 
|-id=666 bgcolor=#d6d6d6
| 156666 ||  || — || May 9, 2002 || Socorro || LINEAR || — || align=right | 6.7 km || 
|-id=667 bgcolor=#d6d6d6
| 156667 ||  || — || May 9, 2002 || Socorro || LINEAR || — || align=right | 6.5 km || 
|-id=668 bgcolor=#d6d6d6
| 156668 ||  || — || May 10, 2002 || Socorro || LINEAR || — || align=right | 4.7 km || 
|-id=669 bgcolor=#FA8072
| 156669 ||  || — || May 6, 2002 || Socorro || LINEAR || H || align=right data-sort-value="0.96" | 960 m || 
|-id=670 bgcolor=#d6d6d6
| 156670 ||  || — || May 11, 2002 || Socorro || LINEAR || LIX || align=right | 6.4 km || 
|-id=671 bgcolor=#d6d6d6
| 156671 ||  || — || May 13, 2002 || Socorro || LINEAR || TIR || align=right | 6.0 km || 
|-id=672 bgcolor=#d6d6d6
| 156672 ||  || — || May 14, 2002 || Socorro || LINEAR || — || align=right | 5.1 km || 
|-id=673 bgcolor=#d6d6d6
| 156673 ||  || — || May 15, 2002 || Haleakala || NEAT || EMA || align=right | 5.9 km || 
|-id=674 bgcolor=#d6d6d6
| 156674 ||  || — || May 15, 2002 || Socorro || LINEAR || ALA || align=right | 5.6 km || 
|-id=675 bgcolor=#d6d6d6
| 156675 ||  || — || May 5, 2002 || Palomar || NEAT || — || align=right | 5.9 km || 
|-id=676 bgcolor=#d6d6d6
| 156676 ||  || — || May 6, 2002 || Palomar || NEAT || — || align=right | 4.5 km || 
|-id=677 bgcolor=#d6d6d6
| 156677 ||  || — || May 7, 2002 || Palomar || NEAT || — || align=right | 4.7 km || 
|-id=678 bgcolor=#d6d6d6
| 156678 ||  || — || May 7, 2002 || Palomar || NEAT || — || align=right | 4.4 km || 
|-id=679 bgcolor=#d6d6d6
| 156679 ||  || — || May 8, 2002 || Socorro || LINEAR || — || align=right | 4.5 km || 
|-id=680 bgcolor=#d6d6d6
| 156680 ||  || — || May 10, 2002 || Kitt Peak || Spacewatch || KOR || align=right | 2.5 km || 
|-id=681 bgcolor=#d6d6d6
| 156681 ||  || — || May 11, 2002 || Socorro || LINEAR || — || align=right | 4.5 km || 
|-id=682 bgcolor=#d6d6d6
| 156682 ||  || — || May 11, 2002 || Socorro || LINEAR || THM || align=right | 3.3 km || 
|-id=683 bgcolor=#d6d6d6
| 156683 ||  || — || May 11, 2002 || Socorro || LINEAR || EOS || align=right | 3.7 km || 
|-id=684 bgcolor=#fefefe
| 156684 ||  || — || May 13, 2002 || Palomar || NEAT || H || align=right | 1.3 km || 
|-id=685 bgcolor=#d6d6d6
| 156685 ||  || — || May 17, 2002 || Socorro || LINEAR || EUP || align=right | 7.9 km || 
|-id=686 bgcolor=#fefefe
| 156686 ||  || — || May 18, 2002 || Socorro || LINEAR || H || align=right data-sort-value="0.92" | 920 m || 
|-id=687 bgcolor=#d6d6d6
| 156687 ||  || — || May 16, 2002 || Socorro || LINEAR || ALA || align=right | 6.0 km || 
|-id=688 bgcolor=#d6d6d6
| 156688 ||  || — || May 18, 2002 || Palomar || NEAT || — || align=right | 3.9 km || 
|-id=689 bgcolor=#d6d6d6
| 156689 || 2002 LQ || — || June 2, 2002 || Socorro || LINEAR || EUP || align=right | 6.2 km || 
|-id=690 bgcolor=#d6d6d6
| 156690 ||  || — || June 2, 2002 || Kitt Peak || Spacewatch || — || align=right | 4.9 km || 
|-id=691 bgcolor=#d6d6d6
| 156691 ||  || — || June 2, 2002 || Socorro || LINEAR || — || align=right | 7.3 km || 
|-id=692 bgcolor=#d6d6d6
| 156692 ||  || — || June 5, 2002 || Socorro || LINEAR || HYG || align=right | 4.5 km || 
|-id=693 bgcolor=#d6d6d6
| 156693 ||  || — || June 5, 2002 || Socorro || LINEAR || — || align=right | 6.6 km || 
|-id=694 bgcolor=#d6d6d6
| 156694 ||  || — || June 6, 2002 || Socorro || LINEAR || — || align=right | 5.9 km || 
|-id=695 bgcolor=#d6d6d6
| 156695 ||  || — || June 6, 2002 || Socorro || LINEAR || TIR || align=right | 5.6 km || 
|-id=696 bgcolor=#d6d6d6
| 156696 ||  || — || June 6, 2002 || Socorro || LINEAR || — || align=right | 4.5 km || 
|-id=697 bgcolor=#fefefe
| 156697 ||  || — || June 6, 2002 || Socorro || LINEAR || — || align=right | 1.4 km || 
|-id=698 bgcolor=#d6d6d6
| 156698 ||  || — || June 7, 2002 || Socorro || LINEAR || — || align=right | 6.0 km || 
|-id=699 bgcolor=#d6d6d6
| 156699 ||  || — || June 9, 2002 || Palomar || NEAT || — || align=right | 6.0 km || 
|-id=700 bgcolor=#d6d6d6
| 156700 ||  || — || June 10, 2002 || Socorro || LINEAR || EOS || align=right | 3.9 km || 
|}

156701–156800 

|-bgcolor=#d6d6d6
| 156701 ||  || — || June 5, 2002 || Palomar || NEAT || — || align=right | 4.7 km || 
|-id=702 bgcolor=#fefefe
| 156702 ||  || — || June 15, 2002 || Socorro || LINEAR || H || align=right data-sort-value="0.85" | 850 m || 
|-id=703 bgcolor=#d6d6d6
| 156703 ||  || — || June 14, 2002 || Kingsnake || J. V. McClusky || — || align=right | 8.6 km || 
|-id=704 bgcolor=#d6d6d6
| 156704 ||  || — || June 8, 2002 || Palomar || NEAT || HYG || align=right | 4.8 km || 
|-id=705 bgcolor=#d6d6d6
| 156705 ||  || — || June 9, 2002 || Haleakala || NEAT || — || align=right | 6.2 km || 
|-id=706 bgcolor=#d6d6d6
| 156706 ||  || — || June 15, 2002 || Socorro || LINEAR || — || align=right | 6.1 km || 
|-id=707 bgcolor=#d6d6d6
| 156707 ||  || — || June 9, 2002 || Socorro || LINEAR || — || align=right | 5.1 km || 
|-id=708 bgcolor=#d6d6d6
| 156708 ||  || — || June 11, 2002 || Palomar || NEAT || — || align=right | 4.4 km || 
|-id=709 bgcolor=#d6d6d6
| 156709 ||  || — || July 1, 2002 || Palomar || NEAT || — || align=right | 5.1 km || 
|-id=710 bgcolor=#fefefe
| 156710 ||  || — || July 9, 2002 || Palomar || NEAT || H || align=right | 1.1 km || 
|-id=711 bgcolor=#d6d6d6
| 156711 ||  || — || July 13, 2002 || Palomar || NEAT || — || align=right | 5.5 km || 
|-id=712 bgcolor=#d6d6d6
| 156712 ||  || — || July 14, 2002 || Socorro || LINEAR || HYG || align=right | 4.5 km || 
|-id=713 bgcolor=#d6d6d6
| 156713 ||  || — || July 18, 2002 || Socorro || LINEAR || — || align=right | 8.4 km || 
|-id=714 bgcolor=#fefefe
| 156714 ||  || — || August 1, 2002 || Socorro || LINEAR || H || align=right data-sort-value="0.95" | 950 m || 
|-id=715 bgcolor=#fefefe
| 156715 ||  || — || August 15, 2002 || Socorro || LINEAR || — || align=right | 1.1 km || 
|-id=716 bgcolor=#FA8072
| 156716 ||  || — || September 4, 2002 || Anderson Mesa || LONEOS || — || align=right data-sort-value="0.99" | 990 m || 
|-id=717 bgcolor=#d6d6d6
| 156717 ||  || — || September 5, 2002 || Socorro || LINEAR || SHU3:2 || align=right | 6.4 km || 
|-id=718 bgcolor=#fefefe
| 156718 ||  || — || October 1, 2002 || Socorro || LINEAR || — || align=right | 1.1 km || 
|-id=719 bgcolor=#fefefe
| 156719 ||  || — || October 2, 2002 || Socorro || LINEAR || — || align=right | 1.0 km || 
|-id=720 bgcolor=#FA8072
| 156720 ||  || — || October 7, 2002 || Socorro || LINEAR || — || align=right | 1.5 km || 
|-id=721 bgcolor=#fefefe
| 156721 ||  || — || October 3, 2002 || Palomar || NEAT || — || align=right | 1.2 km || 
|-id=722 bgcolor=#fefefe
| 156722 ||  || — || October 4, 2002 || Socorro || LINEAR || — || align=right | 1.1 km || 
|-id=723 bgcolor=#fefefe
| 156723 ||  || — || October 7, 2002 || Socorro || LINEAR || — || align=right data-sort-value="0.86" | 860 m || 
|-id=724 bgcolor=#fefefe
| 156724 ||  || — || October 9, 2002 || Socorro || LINEAR || — || align=right | 1.0 km || 
|-id=725 bgcolor=#fefefe
| 156725 ||  || — || October 11, 2002 || Socorro || LINEAR || — || align=right | 2.3 km || 
|-id=726 bgcolor=#fefefe
| 156726 ||  || — || October 31, 2002 || Palomar || NEAT || — || align=right data-sort-value="0.82" | 820 m || 
|-id=727 bgcolor=#fefefe
| 156727 ||  || — || November 1, 2002 || Palomar || NEAT || FLO || align=right data-sort-value="0.74" | 740 m || 
|-id=728 bgcolor=#fefefe
| 156728 ||  || — || November 5, 2002 || Palomar || NEAT || — || align=right | 1.2 km || 
|-id=729 bgcolor=#fefefe
| 156729 ||  || — || November 11, 2002 || Anderson Mesa || LONEOS || — || align=right | 1.1 km || 
|-id=730 bgcolor=#C2FFFF
| 156730 ||  || — || November 13, 2002 || Palomar || NEAT || L5 || align=right | 13 km || 
|-id=731 bgcolor=#fefefe
| 156731 ||  || — || December 2, 2002 || Socorro || LINEAR || — || align=right | 1.0 km || 
|-id=732 bgcolor=#fefefe
| 156732 ||  || — || December 2, 2002 || Socorro || LINEAR || — || align=right | 1.3 km || 
|-id=733 bgcolor=#fefefe
| 156733 ||  || — || December 5, 2002 || Palomar || NEAT || V || align=right | 1.0 km || 
|-id=734 bgcolor=#fefefe
| 156734 ||  || — || December 6, 2002 || Socorro || LINEAR || FLO || align=right | 1.3 km || 
|-id=735 bgcolor=#fefefe
| 156735 ||  || — || December 7, 2002 || Needville || Needville Obs. || — || align=right | 1.4 km || 
|-id=736 bgcolor=#fefefe
| 156736 ||  || — || December 10, 2002 || Socorro || LINEAR || — || align=right | 1.6 km || 
|-id=737 bgcolor=#fefefe
| 156737 ||  || — || December 10, 2002 || Palomar || NEAT || — || align=right | 1.4 km || 
|-id=738 bgcolor=#fefefe
| 156738 ||  || — || December 10, 2002 || Palomar || NEAT || NYS || align=right data-sort-value="0.97" | 970 m || 
|-id=739 bgcolor=#E9E9E9
| 156739 ||  || — || December 11, 2002 || Socorro || LINEAR || ADE || align=right | 4.5 km || 
|-id=740 bgcolor=#fefefe
| 156740 ||  || — || December 11, 2002 || Socorro || LINEAR || — || align=right | 1.3 km || 
|-id=741 bgcolor=#fefefe
| 156741 ||  || — || December 11, 2002 || Socorro || LINEAR || — || align=right | 2.5 km || 
|-id=742 bgcolor=#fefefe
| 156742 ||  || — || December 10, 2002 || Socorro || LINEAR || FLO || align=right | 1.3 km || 
|-id=743 bgcolor=#fefefe
| 156743 ||  || — || December 11, 2002 || Socorro || LINEAR || NYS || align=right | 1.0 km || 
|-id=744 bgcolor=#fefefe
| 156744 ||  || — || December 11, 2002 || Socorro || LINEAR || — || align=right | 1.4 km || 
|-id=745 bgcolor=#fefefe
| 156745 ||  || — || December 11, 2002 || Socorro || LINEAR || — || align=right | 1.5 km || 
|-id=746 bgcolor=#fefefe
| 156746 ||  || — || December 11, 2002 || Socorro || LINEAR || FLO || align=right | 1.2 km || 
|-id=747 bgcolor=#fefefe
| 156747 ||  || — || December 14, 2002 || Socorro || LINEAR || — || align=right data-sort-value="0.98" | 980 m || 
|-id=748 bgcolor=#fefefe
| 156748 ||  || — || December 11, 2002 || Socorro || LINEAR || — || align=right | 1.3 km || 
|-id=749 bgcolor=#fefefe
| 156749 ||  || — || December 11, 2002 || Socorro || LINEAR || — || align=right | 1.1 km || 
|-id=750 bgcolor=#fefefe
| 156750 ||  || — || December 15, 2002 || Haleakala || NEAT || — || align=right | 1.5 km || 
|-id=751 bgcolor=#fefefe
| 156751 Chelseaferrell ||  ||  || December 4, 2002 || Kitt Peak || M. W. Buie || — || align=right | 1.2 km || 
|-id=752 bgcolor=#fefefe
| 156752 ||  || — || December 5, 2002 || Socorro || LINEAR || MAS || align=right | 1.1 km || 
|-id=753 bgcolor=#fefefe
| 156753 || 2002 YW || — || December 27, 2002 || Anderson Mesa || LONEOS || — || align=right | 1.7 km || 
|-id=754 bgcolor=#fefefe
| 156754 ||  || — || December 27, 2002 || Anderson Mesa || LONEOS || — || align=right | 1.6 km || 
|-id=755 bgcolor=#E9E9E9
| 156755 ||  || — || December 28, 2002 || Anderson Mesa || LONEOS || — || align=right | 1.8 km || 
|-id=756 bgcolor=#fefefe
| 156756 ||  || — || December 31, 2002 || Socorro || LINEAR || — || align=right | 1.2 km || 
|-id=757 bgcolor=#fefefe
| 156757 ||  || — || December 28, 2002 || Anderson Mesa || LONEOS || ERI || align=right | 2.4 km || 
|-id=758 bgcolor=#fefefe
| 156758 ||  || — || December 31, 2002 || Socorro || LINEAR || — || align=right | 2.9 km || 
|-id=759 bgcolor=#fefefe
| 156759 ||  || — || December 31, 2002 || Socorro || LINEAR || — || align=right | 2.9 km || 
|-id=760 bgcolor=#fefefe
| 156760 ||  || — || December 31, 2002 || Socorro || LINEAR || NYS || align=right | 1.1 km || 
|-id=761 bgcolor=#fefefe
| 156761 ||  || — || December 31, 2002 || Socorro || LINEAR || — || align=right | 1.2 km || 
|-id=762 bgcolor=#fefefe
| 156762 ||  || — || December 31, 2002 || Socorro || LINEAR || V || align=right | 1.0 km || 
|-id=763 bgcolor=#fefefe
| 156763 ||  || — || January 1, 2003 || Socorro || LINEAR || — || align=right | 1.5 km || 
|-id=764 bgcolor=#fefefe
| 156764 ||  || — || January 1, 2003 || Socorro || LINEAR || — || align=right | 1.6 km || 
|-id=765 bgcolor=#fefefe
| 156765 ||  || — || January 4, 2003 || Socorro || LINEAR || NYS || align=right | 1.2 km || 
|-id=766 bgcolor=#fefefe
| 156766 ||  || — || January 4, 2003 || Socorro || LINEAR || NYS || align=right | 1.4 km || 
|-id=767 bgcolor=#fefefe
| 156767 ||  || — || January 5, 2003 || Socorro || LINEAR || NYS || align=right | 1.2 km || 
|-id=768 bgcolor=#fefefe
| 156768 ||  || — || January 7, 2003 || Socorro || LINEAR || FLO || align=right data-sort-value="0.93" | 930 m || 
|-id=769 bgcolor=#fefefe
| 156769 ||  || — || January 7, 2003 || Socorro || LINEAR || — || align=right | 1.2 km || 
|-id=770 bgcolor=#fefefe
| 156770 ||  || — || January 5, 2003 || Socorro || LINEAR || FLO || align=right | 1.2 km || 
|-id=771 bgcolor=#fefefe
| 156771 ||  || — || January 5, 2003 || Socorro || LINEAR || — || align=right | 1.5 km || 
|-id=772 bgcolor=#fefefe
| 156772 ||  || — || January 5, 2003 || Socorro || LINEAR || — || align=right | 1.2 km || 
|-id=773 bgcolor=#fefefe
| 156773 ||  || — || January 5, 2003 || Socorro || LINEAR || — || align=right | 1.1 km || 
|-id=774 bgcolor=#fefefe
| 156774 ||  || — || January 5, 2003 || Socorro || LINEAR || — || align=right | 1.5 km || 
|-id=775 bgcolor=#fefefe
| 156775 ||  || — || January 7, 2003 || Socorro || LINEAR || FLO || align=right | 1.9 km || 
|-id=776 bgcolor=#fefefe
| 156776 ||  || — || January 7, 2003 || Socorro || LINEAR || — || align=right | 1.5 km || 
|-id=777 bgcolor=#fefefe
| 156777 ||  || — || January 7, 2003 || Socorro || LINEAR || — || align=right | 1.4 km || 
|-id=778 bgcolor=#fefefe
| 156778 ||  || — || January 10, 2003 || Socorro || LINEAR || — || align=right | 1.4 km || 
|-id=779 bgcolor=#fefefe
| 156779 ||  || — || January 10, 2003 || Socorro || LINEAR || KLI || align=right | 2.3 km || 
|-id=780 bgcolor=#fefefe
| 156780 ||  || — || January 10, 2003 || Kitt Peak || Spacewatch || NYS || align=right | 3.0 km || 
|-id=781 bgcolor=#fefefe
| 156781 ||  || — || January 15, 2003 || Palomar || NEAT || — || align=right | 1.5 km || 
|-id=782 bgcolor=#fefefe
| 156782 ||  || — || January 1, 2003 || Socorro || LINEAR || — || align=right | 1.1 km || 
|-id=783 bgcolor=#fefefe
| 156783 ||  || — || January 4, 2003 || Socorro || LINEAR || — || align=right | 3.5 km || 
|-id=784 bgcolor=#fefefe
| 156784 ||  || — || January 10, 2003 || Socorro || LINEAR || — || align=right | 1.7 km || 
|-id=785 bgcolor=#fefefe
| 156785 ||  || — || January 24, 2003 || La Silla || A. Boattini, H. Scholl || — || align=right | 1.2 km || 
|-id=786 bgcolor=#fefefe
| 156786 ||  || — || January 26, 2003 || Kitt Peak || Spacewatch || V || align=right | 1.1 km || 
|-id=787 bgcolor=#fefefe
| 156787 ||  || — || January 26, 2003 || Anderson Mesa || LONEOS || CHL || align=right | 2.5 km || 
|-id=788 bgcolor=#fefefe
| 156788 ||  || — || January 26, 2003 || Anderson Mesa || LONEOS || — || align=right | 2.4 km || 
|-id=789 bgcolor=#fefefe
| 156789 ||  || — || January 26, 2003 || Anderson Mesa || LONEOS || — || align=right | 1.5 km || 
|-id=790 bgcolor=#E9E9E9
| 156790 ||  || — || January 26, 2003 || Anderson Mesa || LONEOS || — || align=right | 1.5 km || 
|-id=791 bgcolor=#fefefe
| 156791 ||  || — || January 26, 2003 || Haleakala || NEAT || NYS || align=right | 1.0 km || 
|-id=792 bgcolor=#fefefe
| 156792 ||  || — || January 26, 2003 || Haleakala || NEAT || NYS || align=right | 1.4 km || 
|-id=793 bgcolor=#fefefe
| 156793 ||  || — || January 26, 2003 || Haleakala || NEAT || NYS || align=right | 1.0 km || 
|-id=794 bgcolor=#fefefe
| 156794 ||  || — || January 26, 2003 || Anderson Mesa || LONEOS || — || align=right | 1.9 km || 
|-id=795 bgcolor=#fefefe
| 156795 ||  || — || January 26, 2003 || Anderson Mesa || LONEOS || V || align=right | 1.2 km || 
|-id=796 bgcolor=#fefefe
| 156796 ||  || — || January 26, 2003 || Haleakala || NEAT || NYS || align=right data-sort-value="0.97" | 970 m || 
|-id=797 bgcolor=#fefefe
| 156797 ||  || — || January 26, 2003 || Haleakala || NEAT || — || align=right | 1.1 km || 
|-id=798 bgcolor=#fefefe
| 156798 ||  || — || January 26, 2003 || Haleakala || NEAT || NYS || align=right | 3.0 km || 
|-id=799 bgcolor=#fefefe
| 156799 ||  || — || January 27, 2003 || Socorro || LINEAR || — || align=right | 1.2 km || 
|-id=800 bgcolor=#fefefe
| 156800 ||  || — || January 27, 2003 || Socorro || LINEAR || EUT || align=right | 1.0 km || 
|}

156801–156900 

|-bgcolor=#fefefe
| 156801 ||  || — || January 27, 2003 || Haleakala || NEAT || NYS || align=right | 1.3 km || 
|-id=802 bgcolor=#fefefe
| 156802 ||  || — || January 25, 2003 || Palomar || NEAT || — || align=right | 1.2 km || 
|-id=803 bgcolor=#fefefe
| 156803 ||  || — || January 26, 2003 || Anderson Mesa || LONEOS || NYS || align=right | 1.1 km || 
|-id=804 bgcolor=#fefefe
| 156804 ||  || — || January 26, 2003 || Kitt Peak || Spacewatch || FLO || align=right | 1.2 km || 
|-id=805 bgcolor=#fefefe
| 156805 ||  || — || January 27, 2003 || Haleakala || NEAT || — || align=right | 2.2 km || 
|-id=806 bgcolor=#fefefe
| 156806 ||  || — || January 27, 2003 || Socorro || LINEAR || V || align=right | 1.1 km || 
|-id=807 bgcolor=#fefefe
| 156807 ||  || — || January 27, 2003 || Socorro || LINEAR || FLO || align=right | 1.2 km || 
|-id=808 bgcolor=#fefefe
| 156808 ||  || — || January 27, 2003 || Socorro || LINEAR || FLO || align=right | 1.1 km || 
|-id=809 bgcolor=#fefefe
| 156809 ||  || — || January 27, 2003 || Socorro || LINEAR || — || align=right | 1.5 km || 
|-id=810 bgcolor=#fefefe
| 156810 ||  || — || January 27, 2003 || Anderson Mesa || LONEOS || NYS || align=right data-sort-value="0.98" | 980 m || 
|-id=811 bgcolor=#fefefe
| 156811 ||  || — || January 27, 2003 || Socorro || LINEAR || NYS || align=right data-sort-value="0.87" | 870 m || 
|-id=812 bgcolor=#fefefe
| 156812 ||  || — || January 27, 2003 || Socorro || LINEAR || — || align=right | 2.9 km || 
|-id=813 bgcolor=#fefefe
| 156813 ||  || — || January 27, 2003 || Socorro || LINEAR || FLO || align=right | 1.1 km || 
|-id=814 bgcolor=#E9E9E9
| 156814 ||  || — || January 27, 2003 || Socorro || LINEAR || — || align=right | 2.2 km || 
|-id=815 bgcolor=#fefefe
| 156815 ||  || — || January 27, 2003 || Socorro || LINEAR || NYS || align=right | 2.8 km || 
|-id=816 bgcolor=#fefefe
| 156816 ||  || — || January 27, 2003 || Socorro || LINEAR || NYS || align=right | 2.2 km || 
|-id=817 bgcolor=#fefefe
| 156817 ||  || — || January 27, 2003 || Palomar || NEAT || — || align=right | 1.3 km || 
|-id=818 bgcolor=#fefefe
| 156818 ||  || — || January 27, 2003 || Palomar || NEAT || NYS || align=right | 1.4 km || 
|-id=819 bgcolor=#fefefe
| 156819 ||  || — || January 30, 2003 || Anderson Mesa || LONEOS || MAS || align=right | 1.1 km || 
|-id=820 bgcolor=#fefefe
| 156820 ||  || — || January 27, 2003 || Palomar || NEAT || NYS || align=right data-sort-value="0.72" | 720 m || 
|-id=821 bgcolor=#fefefe
| 156821 ||  || — || January 27, 2003 || Socorro || LINEAR || — || align=right | 2.1 km || 
|-id=822 bgcolor=#fefefe
| 156822 ||  || — || January 27, 2003 || Palomar || NEAT || NYS || align=right data-sort-value="0.91" | 910 m || 
|-id=823 bgcolor=#fefefe
| 156823 ||  || — || January 27, 2003 || Palomar || NEAT || — || align=right | 1.9 km || 
|-id=824 bgcolor=#fefefe
| 156824 ||  || — || January 28, 2003 || Kitt Peak || Spacewatch || — || align=right | 1.7 km || 
|-id=825 bgcolor=#fefefe
| 156825 ||  || — || January 30, 2003 || Anderson Mesa || LONEOS || — || align=right | 1.4 km || 
|-id=826 bgcolor=#fefefe
| 156826 ||  || — || January 30, 2003 || Kitt Peak || Spacewatch || MAS || align=right data-sort-value="0.97" | 970 m || 
|-id=827 bgcolor=#fefefe
| 156827 ||  || — || January 30, 2003 || Anderson Mesa || LONEOS || — || align=right | 3.0 km || 
|-id=828 bgcolor=#fefefe
| 156828 ||  || — || January 28, 2003 || Socorro || LINEAR || — || align=right | 2.9 km || 
|-id=829 bgcolor=#E9E9E9
| 156829 ||  || — || January 28, 2003 || Socorro || LINEAR || BAR || align=right | 2.2 km || 
|-id=830 bgcolor=#fefefe
| 156830 ||  || — || January 31, 2003 || Socorro || LINEAR || — || align=right data-sort-value="0.93" | 930 m || 
|-id=831 bgcolor=#fefefe
| 156831 ||  || — || January 30, 2003 || Anderson Mesa || LONEOS || — || align=right | 3.4 km || 
|-id=832 bgcolor=#fefefe
| 156832 ||  || — || January 30, 2003 || Haleakala || NEAT || FLO || align=right | 1.1 km || 
|-id=833 bgcolor=#fefefe
| 156833 ||  || — || January 26, 2003 || Anderson Mesa || LONEOS || — || align=right | 1.9 km || 
|-id=834 bgcolor=#fefefe
| 156834 ||  || — || January 27, 2003 || Socorro || LINEAR || MAS || align=right | 1.1 km || 
|-id=835 bgcolor=#fefefe
| 156835 ||  || — || January 27, 2003 || Socorro || LINEAR || — || align=right | 1.1 km || 
|-id=836 bgcolor=#fefefe
| 156836 || 2003 CS || — || February 1, 2003 || Socorro || LINEAR || — || align=right | 1.6 km || 
|-id=837 bgcolor=#fefefe
| 156837 ||  || — || February 1, 2003 || Socorro || LINEAR || — || align=right | 1.6 km || 
|-id=838 bgcolor=#fefefe
| 156838 ||  || — || February 1, 2003 || Socorro || LINEAR || NYS || align=right data-sort-value="0.84" | 840 m || 
|-id=839 bgcolor=#fefefe
| 156839 ||  || — || February 2, 2003 || Socorro || LINEAR || — || align=right | 2.6 km || 
|-id=840 bgcolor=#fefefe
| 156840 ||  || — || February 1, 2003 || Socorro || LINEAR || — || align=right | 1.6 km || 
|-id=841 bgcolor=#fefefe
| 156841 ||  || — || February 1, 2003 || Socorro || LINEAR || — || align=right | 2.6 km || 
|-id=842 bgcolor=#fefefe
| 156842 ||  || — || February 1, 2003 || Socorro || LINEAR || NYS || align=right data-sort-value="0.96" | 960 m || 
|-id=843 bgcolor=#E9E9E9
| 156843 ||  || — || February 1, 2003 || Socorro || LINEAR || MAR || align=right | 2.1 km || 
|-id=844 bgcolor=#fefefe
| 156844 ||  || — || February 1, 2003 || Socorro || LINEAR || — || align=right | 1.5 km || 
|-id=845 bgcolor=#fefefe
| 156845 ||  || — || February 1, 2003 || Haleakala || NEAT || MAS || align=right | 1.3 km || 
|-id=846 bgcolor=#fefefe
| 156846 ||  || — || February 1, 2003 || Socorro || LINEAR || NYS || align=right data-sort-value="0.74" | 740 m || 
|-id=847 bgcolor=#fefefe
| 156847 ||  || — || February 2, 2003 || Socorro || LINEAR || — || align=right | 1.8 km || 
|-id=848 bgcolor=#fefefe
| 156848 ||  || — || February 4, 2003 || Kitt Peak || Spacewatch || MAS || align=right data-sort-value="0.92" | 920 m || 
|-id=849 bgcolor=#fefefe
| 156849 ||  || — || February 6, 2003 || Kitt Peak || Spacewatch || — || align=right data-sort-value="0.98" | 980 m || 
|-id=850 bgcolor=#fefefe
| 156850 ||  || — || February 4, 2003 || Haleakala || NEAT || — || align=right data-sort-value="0.98" | 980 m || 
|-id=851 bgcolor=#fefefe
| 156851 ||  || — || February 4, 2003 || Socorro || LINEAR || EUT || align=right data-sort-value="0.87" | 870 m || 
|-id=852 bgcolor=#fefefe
| 156852 ||  || — || February 8, 2003 || Haleakala || NEAT || — || align=right | 1.5 km || 
|-id=853 bgcolor=#fefefe
| 156853 ||  || — || February 7, 2003 || Desert Eagle || W. K. Y. Yeung || — || align=right | 1.2 km || 
|-id=854 bgcolor=#fefefe
| 156854 ||  || — || February 8, 2003 || Socorro || LINEAR || — || align=right | 2.9 km || 
|-id=855 bgcolor=#fefefe
| 156855 ||  || — || February 10, 2003 || Needville || Needville Obs. || NYS || align=right data-sort-value="0.97" | 970 m || 
|-id=856 bgcolor=#fefefe
| 156856 ||  || — || February 9, 2003 || Palomar || NEAT || — || align=right | 1.3 km || 
|-id=857 bgcolor=#fefefe
| 156857 ||  || — || February 1, 2003 || Kitt Peak || Spacewatch || — || align=right | 3.2 km || 
|-id=858 bgcolor=#E9E9E9
| 156858 ||  || — || February 22, 2003 || Palomar || NEAT || EUN || align=right | 2.1 km || 
|-id=859 bgcolor=#fefefe
| 156859 ||  || — || February 19, 2003 || Palomar || NEAT || — || align=right | 1.1 km || 
|-id=860 bgcolor=#fefefe
| 156860 ||  || — || February 22, 2003 || Palomar || NEAT || — || align=right | 3.2 km || 
|-id=861 bgcolor=#fefefe
| 156861 ||  || — || February 22, 2003 || Palomar || NEAT || MAS || align=right data-sort-value="0.96" | 960 m || 
|-id=862 bgcolor=#fefefe
| 156862 ||  || — || February 24, 2003 || Campo Imperatore || CINEOS || — || align=right | 1.2 km || 
|-id=863 bgcolor=#fefefe
| 156863 ||  || — || February 25, 2003 || Haleakala || NEAT || MAS || align=right data-sort-value="0.92" | 920 m || 
|-id=864 bgcolor=#fefefe
| 156864 ||  || — || February 26, 2003 || Campo Imperatore || CINEOS || MAS || align=right | 1.2 km || 
|-id=865 bgcolor=#fefefe
| 156865 ||  || — || February 23, 2003 || Haleakala || NEAT || CHL || align=right | 3.0 km || 
|-id=866 bgcolor=#fefefe
| 156866 ||  || — || February 26, 2003 || Črni Vrh || Črni Vrh || NYS || align=right | 1.3 km || 
|-id=867 bgcolor=#fefefe
| 156867 ||  || — || February 27, 2003 || Kleť || Kleť Obs. || NYS || align=right | 1.0 km || 
|-id=868 bgcolor=#fefefe
| 156868 ||  || — || February 19, 2003 || Palomar || NEAT || V || align=right | 1.0 km || 
|-id=869 bgcolor=#fefefe
| 156869 ||  || — || February 23, 2003 || Goodricke-Pigott || J. W. Kessel || NYS || align=right | 1.2 km || 
|-id=870 bgcolor=#fefefe
| 156870 ||  || — || February 21, 2003 || Palomar || NEAT || NYS || align=right | 1.1 km || 
|-id=871 bgcolor=#fefefe
| 156871 ||  || — || February 21, 2003 || Palomar || NEAT || NYS || align=right | 1.0 km || 
|-id=872 bgcolor=#E9E9E9
| 156872 ||  || — || February 22, 2003 || Palomar || NEAT || — || align=right | 1.3 km || 
|-id=873 bgcolor=#fefefe
| 156873 ||  || — || February 22, 2003 || Palomar || NEAT || EUT || align=right | 1.1 km || 
|-id=874 bgcolor=#fefefe
| 156874 ||  || — || February 22, 2003 || Palomar || NEAT || V || align=right | 1.2 km || 
|-id=875 bgcolor=#fefefe
| 156875 ||  || — || February 22, 2003 || Palomar || NEAT || NYS || align=right | 1.2 km || 
|-id=876 bgcolor=#fefefe
| 156876 ||  || — || February 22, 2003 || Palomar || NEAT || MAS || align=right | 1.1 km || 
|-id=877 bgcolor=#fefefe
| 156877 ||  || — || February 28, 2003 || Socorro || LINEAR || — || align=right | 1.7 km || 
|-id=878 bgcolor=#fefefe
| 156878 ||  || — || March 5, 2003 || Socorro || LINEAR || PHO || align=right | 2.4 km || 
|-id=879 bgcolor=#fefefe
| 156879 Eloïs ||  ||  || March 4, 2003 || Saint-Véran || Saint-Véran Obs. || NYS || align=right | 2.9 km || 
|-id=880 bgcolor=#fefefe
| 156880 Bernardtregon ||  ||  || March 4, 2003 || Saint-Véran || Saint-Véran Obs. || — || align=right | 1.3 km || 
|-id=881 bgcolor=#fefefe
| 156881 ||  || — || March 5, 2003 || Socorro || LINEAR || — || align=right | 1.1 km || 
|-id=882 bgcolor=#fefefe
| 156882 ||  || — || March 6, 2003 || Socorro || LINEAR || NYS || align=right data-sort-value="0.98" | 980 m || 
|-id=883 bgcolor=#fefefe
| 156883 ||  || — || March 6, 2003 || Desert Eagle || W. K. Y. Yeung || KLI || align=right | 2.8 km || 
|-id=884 bgcolor=#fefefe
| 156884 ||  || — || March 6, 2003 || Socorro || LINEAR || — || align=right | 1.7 km || 
|-id=885 bgcolor=#fefefe
| 156885 ||  || — || March 6, 2003 || Anderson Mesa || LONEOS || — || align=right | 1.7 km || 
|-id=886 bgcolor=#fefefe
| 156886 ||  || — || March 6, 2003 || Socorro || LINEAR || — || align=right | 1.5 km || 
|-id=887 bgcolor=#fefefe
| 156887 ||  || — || March 6, 2003 || Palomar || NEAT || V || align=right | 1.0 km || 
|-id=888 bgcolor=#fefefe
| 156888 ||  || — || March 7, 2003 || Socorro || LINEAR || V || align=right | 1.2 km || 
|-id=889 bgcolor=#fefefe
| 156889 ||  || — || March 6, 2003 || Anderson Mesa || LONEOS || MAS || align=right | 1.0 km || 
|-id=890 bgcolor=#fefefe
| 156890 ||  || — || March 6, 2003 || Socorro || LINEAR || NYS || align=right | 1.2 km || 
|-id=891 bgcolor=#fefefe
| 156891 ||  || — || March 6, 2003 || Socorro || LINEAR || — || align=right | 1.3 km || 
|-id=892 bgcolor=#fefefe
| 156892 ||  || — || March 6, 2003 || Socorro || LINEAR || NYS || align=right | 1.3 km || 
|-id=893 bgcolor=#fefefe
| 156893 ||  || — || March 6, 2003 || Socorro || LINEAR || NYS || align=right | 1.3 km || 
|-id=894 bgcolor=#fefefe
| 156894 ||  || — || March 6, 2003 || Socorro || LINEAR || — || align=right | 1.2 km || 
|-id=895 bgcolor=#fefefe
| 156895 ||  || — || March 6, 2003 || Anderson Mesa || LONEOS || SVE || align=right | 4.1 km || 
|-id=896 bgcolor=#fefefe
| 156896 ||  || — || March 6, 2003 || Anderson Mesa || LONEOS || NYS || align=right | 1.3 km || 
|-id=897 bgcolor=#fefefe
| 156897 ||  || — || March 6, 2003 || Anderson Mesa || LONEOS || — || align=right | 2.3 km || 
|-id=898 bgcolor=#fefefe
| 156898 ||  || — || March 6, 2003 || Palomar || NEAT || — || align=right data-sort-value="0.82" | 820 m || 
|-id=899 bgcolor=#fefefe
| 156899 ||  || — || March 6, 2003 || Palomar || NEAT || NYS || align=right data-sort-value="0.98" | 980 m || 
|-id=900 bgcolor=#fefefe
| 156900 ||  || — || March 6, 2003 || Palomar || NEAT || MAS || align=right data-sort-value="0.95" | 950 m || 
|}

156901–157000 

|-bgcolor=#fefefe
| 156901 ||  || — || March 7, 2003 || Anderson Mesa || LONEOS || — || align=right | 1.6 km || 
|-id=902 bgcolor=#fefefe
| 156902 ||  || — || March 7, 2003 || Socorro || LINEAR || — || align=right | 1.9 km || 
|-id=903 bgcolor=#fefefe
| 156903 ||  || — || March 7, 2003 || Socorro || LINEAR || V || align=right | 1.4 km || 
|-id=904 bgcolor=#fefefe
| 156904 ||  || — || March 7, 2003 || Anderson Mesa || LONEOS || V || align=right | 1.1 km || 
|-id=905 bgcolor=#fefefe
| 156905 ||  || — || March 7, 2003 || Anderson Mesa || LONEOS || NYS || align=right data-sort-value="0.95" | 950 m || 
|-id=906 bgcolor=#E9E9E9
| 156906 ||  || — || March 8, 2003 || Anderson Mesa || LONEOS || — || align=right | 1.9 km || 
|-id=907 bgcolor=#fefefe
| 156907 ||  || — || March 8, 2003 || Socorro || LINEAR || — || align=right | 3.4 km || 
|-id=908 bgcolor=#fefefe
| 156908 ||  || — || March 9, 2003 || Socorro || LINEAR || — || align=right | 1.1 km || 
|-id=909 bgcolor=#fefefe
| 156909 ||  || — || March 8, 2003 || Socorro || LINEAR || — || align=right | 1.7 km || 
|-id=910 bgcolor=#E9E9E9
| 156910 ||  || — || March 26, 2003 || Campo Imperatore || CINEOS || EUN || align=right | 1.8 km || 
|-id=911 bgcolor=#E9E9E9
| 156911 ||  || — || March 23, 2003 || Kitt Peak || Spacewatch || — || align=right | 2.1 km || 
|-id=912 bgcolor=#fefefe
| 156912 ||  || — || March 24, 2003 || Kitt Peak || Spacewatch || MAS || align=right | 1.3 km || 
|-id=913 bgcolor=#E9E9E9
| 156913 ||  || — || March 24, 2003 || Haleakala || NEAT || — || align=right | 1.7 km || 
|-id=914 bgcolor=#fefefe
| 156914 ||  || — || March 23, 2003 || Palomar || NEAT || — || align=right | 1.5 km || 
|-id=915 bgcolor=#E9E9E9
| 156915 ||  || — || March 23, 2003 || Kitt Peak || Spacewatch || — || align=right | 1.9 km || 
|-id=916 bgcolor=#E9E9E9
| 156916 ||  || — || March 24, 2003 || Kitt Peak || Spacewatch || — || align=right | 2.0 km || 
|-id=917 bgcolor=#fefefe
| 156917 ||  || — || March 23, 2003 || Kitt Peak || Spacewatch || — || align=right | 1.3 km || 
|-id=918 bgcolor=#E9E9E9
| 156918 ||  || — || March 24, 2003 || Haleakala || NEAT || — || align=right | 1.7 km || 
|-id=919 bgcolor=#fefefe
| 156919 ||  || — || March 25, 2003 || Palomar || NEAT || V || align=right | 1.1 km || 
|-id=920 bgcolor=#fefefe
| 156920 ||  || — || March 26, 2003 || Palomar || NEAT || NYS || align=right data-sort-value="0.81" | 810 m || 
|-id=921 bgcolor=#fefefe
| 156921 ||  || — || March 26, 2003 || Palomar || NEAT || NYS || align=right data-sort-value="0.93" | 930 m || 
|-id=922 bgcolor=#fefefe
| 156922 ||  || — || March 26, 2003 || Palomar || NEAT || MAS || align=right | 1.1 km || 
|-id=923 bgcolor=#fefefe
| 156923 ||  || — || March 26, 2003 || Palomar || NEAT || — || align=right | 1.7 km || 
|-id=924 bgcolor=#fefefe
| 156924 ||  || — || March 26, 2003 || Palomar || NEAT || — || align=right | 1.4 km || 
|-id=925 bgcolor=#fefefe
| 156925 ||  || — || March 26, 2003 || Palomar || NEAT || V || align=right | 1.2 km || 
|-id=926 bgcolor=#fefefe
| 156926 ||  || — || March 26, 2003 || Kitt Peak || Spacewatch || MAS || align=right | 1.3 km || 
|-id=927 bgcolor=#fefefe
| 156927 ||  || — || March 26, 2003 || Palomar || NEAT || NYS || align=right | 1.1 km || 
|-id=928 bgcolor=#fefefe
| 156928 ||  || — || March 26, 2003 || Haleakala || NEAT || NYS || align=right data-sort-value="0.99" | 990 m || 
|-id=929 bgcolor=#E9E9E9
| 156929 ||  || — || March 26, 2003 || Palomar || NEAT || — || align=right | 1.6 km || 
|-id=930 bgcolor=#E9E9E9
| 156930 ||  || — || March 26, 2003 || Palomar || NEAT || — || align=right | 2.1 km || 
|-id=931 bgcolor=#E9E9E9
| 156931 ||  || — || March 27, 2003 || Palomar || NEAT || — || align=right | 3.4 km || 
|-id=932 bgcolor=#fefefe
| 156932 ||  || — || March 28, 2003 || Kitt Peak || Spacewatch || V || align=right | 1.3 km || 
|-id=933 bgcolor=#E9E9E9
| 156933 ||  || — || March 30, 2003 || Kitt Peak || Spacewatch || — || align=right | 3.4 km || 
|-id=934 bgcolor=#E9E9E9
| 156934 ||  || — || March 30, 2003 || Anderson Mesa || LONEOS || — || align=right | 4.2 km || 
|-id=935 bgcolor=#fefefe
| 156935 ||  || — || March 24, 2003 || Kitt Peak || Spacewatch || NYS || align=right | 1.1 km || 
|-id=936 bgcolor=#fefefe
| 156936 ||  || — || March 31, 2003 || Socorro || LINEAR || — || align=right | 1.8 km || 
|-id=937 bgcolor=#fefefe
| 156937 ||  || — || March 30, 2003 || Socorro || LINEAR || — || align=right | 1.6 km || 
|-id=938 bgcolor=#fefefe
| 156938 ||  || — || March 26, 2003 || Anderson Mesa || LONEOS || MAS || align=right | 1.2 km || 
|-id=939 bgcolor=#E9E9E9
| 156939 Odegard ||  ||  || March 24, 2003 || Goodricke-Pigott || V. Reddy || — || align=right | 2.0 km || 
|-id=940 bgcolor=#fefefe
| 156940 ||  || — || March 25, 2003 || Anderson Mesa || LONEOS || NYS || align=right | 1.1 km || 
|-id=941 bgcolor=#E9E9E9
| 156941 ||  || — || April 2, 2003 || Haleakala || NEAT || — || align=right | 2.1 km || 
|-id=942 bgcolor=#fefefe
| 156942 ||  || — || April 1, 2003 || Socorro || LINEAR || V || align=right | 1.5 km || 
|-id=943 bgcolor=#fefefe
| 156943 ||  || — || April 1, 2003 || Socorro || LINEAR || NYS || align=right | 1.3 km || 
|-id=944 bgcolor=#fefefe
| 156944 ||  || — || April 1, 2003 || Socorro || LINEAR || — || align=right | 1.2 km || 
|-id=945 bgcolor=#E9E9E9
| 156945 ||  || — || April 1, 2003 || Socorro || LINEAR || — || align=right | 1.5 km || 
|-id=946 bgcolor=#fefefe
| 156946 ||  || — || April 1, 2003 || Socorro || LINEAR || — || align=right | 1.5 km || 
|-id=947 bgcolor=#E9E9E9
| 156947 ||  || — || April 1, 2003 || Socorro || LINEAR || — || align=right | 1.5 km || 
|-id=948 bgcolor=#fefefe
| 156948 ||  || — || April 4, 2003 || Kitt Peak || Spacewatch || FLO || align=right data-sort-value="0.99" | 990 m || 
|-id=949 bgcolor=#E9E9E9
| 156949 ||  || — || April 4, 2003 || Kitt Peak || Spacewatch || — || align=right | 1.6 km || 
|-id=950 bgcolor=#E9E9E9
| 156950 ||  || — || April 9, 2003 || Palomar || NEAT || — || align=right | 1.4 km || 
|-id=951 bgcolor=#E9E9E9
| 156951 ||  || — || April 9, 2003 || Kitt Peak || Spacewatch || EUN || align=right | 1.9 km || 
|-id=952 bgcolor=#E9E9E9
| 156952 ||  || — || April 7, 2003 || Socorro || LINEAR || RAF || align=right | 1.6 km || 
|-id=953 bgcolor=#E9E9E9
| 156953 ||  || — || April 25, 2003 || Anderson Mesa || LONEOS || — || align=right | 3.0 km || 
|-id=954 bgcolor=#E9E9E9
| 156954 ||  || — || April 23, 2003 || Campo Imperatore || CINEOS || — || align=right | 3.0 km || 
|-id=955 bgcolor=#E9E9E9
| 156955 ||  || — || April 24, 2003 || Kitt Peak || Spacewatch || — || align=right | 2.2 km || 
|-id=956 bgcolor=#E9E9E9
| 156956 ||  || — || April 26, 2003 || Haleakala || NEAT || — || align=right | 1.7 km || 
|-id=957 bgcolor=#E9E9E9
| 156957 ||  || — || April 24, 2003 || Anderson Mesa || LONEOS || — || align=right | 1.6 km || 
|-id=958 bgcolor=#E9E9E9
| 156958 ||  || — || April 27, 2003 || Anderson Mesa || LONEOS || EUN || align=right | 1.8 km || 
|-id=959 bgcolor=#E9E9E9
| 156959 ||  || — || April 28, 2003 || Kitt Peak || Spacewatch || — || align=right | 1.9 km || 
|-id=960 bgcolor=#E9E9E9
| 156960 ||  || — || April 28, 2003 || Haleakala || NEAT || — || align=right | 4.5 km || 
|-id=961 bgcolor=#fefefe
| 156961 ||  || — || April 28, 2003 || Socorro || LINEAR || — || align=right | 1.6 km || 
|-id=962 bgcolor=#E9E9E9
| 156962 ||  || — || April 28, 2003 || Anderson Mesa || LONEOS || — || align=right | 2.3 km || 
|-id=963 bgcolor=#E9E9E9
| 156963 ||  || — || April 28, 2003 || Anderson Mesa || LONEOS || EUN || align=right | 5.1 km || 
|-id=964 bgcolor=#E9E9E9
| 156964 ||  || — || April 28, 2003 || Anderson Mesa || LONEOS || — || align=right | 4.0 km || 
|-id=965 bgcolor=#fefefe
| 156965 ||  || — || April 28, 2003 || Kitt Peak || Spacewatch || — || align=right | 1.2 km || 
|-id=966 bgcolor=#E9E9E9
| 156966 ||  || — || April 28, 2003 || Anderson Mesa || LONEOS || — || align=right | 3.0 km || 
|-id=967 bgcolor=#E9E9E9
| 156967 ||  || — || April 27, 2003 || Anderson Mesa || LONEOS || — || align=right | 1.3 km || 
|-id=968 bgcolor=#E9E9E9
| 156968 ||  || — || April 29, 2003 || Socorro || LINEAR || — || align=right | 1.9 km || 
|-id=969 bgcolor=#E9E9E9
| 156969 ||  || — || April 27, 2003 || Anderson Mesa || LONEOS || — || align=right | 2.2 km || 
|-id=970 bgcolor=#E9E9E9
| 156970 ||  || — || April 29, 2003 || Anderson Mesa || LONEOS || — || align=right | 2.6 km || 
|-id=971 bgcolor=#E9E9E9
| 156971 ||  || — || April 29, 2003 || Anderson Mesa || LONEOS || — || align=right | 1.2 km || 
|-id=972 bgcolor=#E9E9E9
| 156972 ||  || — || May 3, 2003 || Reedy Creek || J. Broughton || — || align=right | 4.4 km || 
|-id=973 bgcolor=#fefefe
| 156973 ||  || — || May 1, 2003 || Kitt Peak || Spacewatch || — || align=right | 1.1 km || 
|-id=974 bgcolor=#E9E9E9
| 156974 ||  || — || May 1, 2003 || Socorro || LINEAR || — || align=right | 1.6 km || 
|-id=975 bgcolor=#E9E9E9
| 156975 ||  || — || May 1, 2003 || Kitt Peak || Spacewatch || — || align=right | 1.7 km || 
|-id=976 bgcolor=#E9E9E9
| 156976 ||  || — || May 2, 2003 || Socorro || LINEAR || — || align=right | 1.8 km || 
|-id=977 bgcolor=#E9E9E9
| 156977 ||  || — || May 1, 2003 || Pla D'Arguines || R. Ferrando || — || align=right | 1.9 km || 
|-id=978 bgcolor=#E9E9E9
| 156978 ||  || — || May 5, 2003 || Kitt Peak || Spacewatch || — || align=right | 1.5 km || 
|-id=979 bgcolor=#E9E9E9
| 156979 ||  || — || May 5, 2003 || Bergisch Gladbach || W. Bickel || MAR || align=right | 2.0 km || 
|-id=980 bgcolor=#E9E9E9
| 156980 ||  || — || May 6, 2003 || Kitt Peak || Spacewatch || — || align=right | 1.5 km || 
|-id=981 bgcolor=#E9E9E9
| 156981 ||  || — || May 22, 2003 || Kitt Peak || Spacewatch || — || align=right | 2.6 km || 
|-id=982 bgcolor=#E9E9E9
| 156982 ||  || — || May 22, 2003 || Kitt Peak || Spacewatch || — || align=right | 3.4 km || 
|-id=983 bgcolor=#E9E9E9
| 156983 ||  || — || May 23, 2003 || Kitt Peak || Spacewatch || — || align=right | 2.1 km || 
|-id=984 bgcolor=#E9E9E9
| 156984 ||  || — || May 26, 2003 || Bohyunsan || Bohyunsan Obs. || — || align=right | 4.2 km || 
|-id=985 bgcolor=#E9E9E9
| 156985 ||  || — || May 27, 2003 || Haleakala || NEAT || — || align=right | 4.5 km || 
|-id=986 bgcolor=#E9E9E9
| 156986 ||  || — || May 24, 2003 || Kitt Peak || Spacewatch || — || align=right | 2.3 km || 
|-id=987 bgcolor=#E9E9E9
| 156987 ||  || — || May 27, 2003 || Anderson Mesa || LONEOS || — || align=right | 3.7 km || 
|-id=988 bgcolor=#E9E9E9
| 156988 ||  || — || May 27, 2003 || Anderson Mesa || LONEOS || — || align=right | 5.6 km || 
|-id=989 bgcolor=#E9E9E9
| 156989 ||  || — || May 27, 2003 || Kitt Peak || Spacewatch || — || align=right | 1.9 km || 
|-id=990 bgcolor=#E9E9E9
| 156990 Claerbout ||  ||  || May 28, 2003 || Needville || J. Dellinger || HNS || align=right | 3.0 km || 
|-id=991 bgcolor=#E9E9E9
| 156991 ||  || — || June 2, 2003 || Kitt Peak || Spacewatch || — || align=right | 1.7 km || 
|-id=992 bgcolor=#E9E9E9
| 156992 ||  || — || June 7, 2003 || Socorro || LINEAR || BAR || align=right | 2.9 km || 
|-id=993 bgcolor=#E9E9E9
| 156993 || 2003 ME || — || June 21, 2003 || Socorro || LINEAR || BAR || align=right | 3.1 km || 
|-id=994 bgcolor=#E9E9E9
| 156994 ||  || — || June 27, 2003 || Anderson Mesa || LONEOS || — || align=right | 6.2 km || 
|-id=995 bgcolor=#E9E9E9
| 156995 || 2003 NM || — || July 1, 2003 || Socorro || LINEAR || EUN || align=right | 2.3 km || 
|-id=996 bgcolor=#E9E9E9
| 156996 ||  || — || July 22, 2003 || Haleakala || NEAT || — || align=right | 4.1 km || 
|-id=997 bgcolor=#d6d6d6
| 156997 ||  || — || July 22, 2003 || Haleakala || NEAT || — || align=right | 4.2 km || 
|-id=998 bgcolor=#d6d6d6
| 156998 ||  || — || July 25, 2003 || Palomar || NEAT || EOS || align=right | 3.2 km || 
|-id=999 bgcolor=#d6d6d6
| 156999 ||  || — || July 23, 2003 || Palomar || NEAT || — || align=right | 7.3 km || 
|-id=000 bgcolor=#d6d6d6
| 157000 ||  || — || July 20, 2003 || Palomar || NEAT || — || align=right | 6.6 km || 
|}

References

External links 
 Discovery Circumstances: Numbered Minor Planets (155001)–(160000) (IAU Minor Planet Center)

0156